A double album is a collection of two LP records or Compact Discs bought as a single unit. This allows a performance longer than the standard running time of the medium to be presented as a single package.

Until the mid-1960s, double albums were rare and not considered significant. The first popular example was Bob Dylan's Blonde on Blonde, released in 1966, soon followed by The Mothers of Invention's debut album Freak Out!. The Beatles' White Album, released in 1968, showed a wide variety of musical styles that the group thought would be difficult to cram onto a single LP.

0–9 and punctuation
 μ-ziq - Bluff Limbo (1994) - 2×CD - studio
 The 1975 - The 1975 (2013) - 2×LP – studio

A
 Above This – Alloquy & Terrene (2015) – 2xLP – studio
 Acid Mothers Temple & the Melting Paraiso U.F.O. - Do Whatever You Want, Don't Do Whatever You Don't!! (2002) – 2xCD compilation
 Aera - Mechelwind (2009)
 Ryan Adams and The Cardinals - Cold Roses (2005) - 2×CD - studio
 Afroman - Afroholic... The Even Better Times (2004) - 2×CD - studio
 Christina Aguilera - Back to Basics (2006) - 2×CD - studio
 Air Liquide - The Increased Difficulty of Concentration (1994) - 2×CD - studio 
 Jason Aldean – Macon, Georgia (2021/2022) – 2xCD – studio
 The Allman Brothers Band - At Fillmore East (1971) - 2×LP - live
 Bernard Allison - Live at the Jazzhaus (2011) 
 The Allman Brothers Band – Eat a Peach (1972) – 2×LP, 1×CD – live/studio
 The Allman Brothers Band - Beginnings (1973) - 2×LP, 1×CD - compilation
 The Allman Brothers Band - Wipe The Windows, Check The Oil, Dollar Gas (1976) - 2×LP - live
 The Allman Brothers Band - The Fillmore Concerts (1992)
 Almunia - Pulsar (2013) - 2×LP - studio
 Alquin - 3 Originals (1999) – 2×CD reissue
 Alquin - The Marks sessions: Expanded edition (2013) – 2×CD – reissue
 Amanaz - Africa (1975; 2015) – 2×LP; 2×CD w/ reverb mix reissue
 America - Here & Now (2007)
 Amon Düül I - Disaster – Lüüd Noma (1973) - 2×LP - studio
 Amon Düül II - Yeti (1970) - 2×LP - studio
 Amon Düül II - Tanz der Lemminge (1971) - 2×LP - studio
 Amon Düül II - Made in Germany (1975) – 2×LP – studio
 Tori Amos - To Venus and Back (1999) - 2×CD -  studio/live
 Ancient Desert Ritual  - Notch (2014) - 2×CD -  studio/conceptual
 Laurie Anderson, John Giorno, William S. Burroughs - You're the Guy I Want To Share My Money With (1981) - 2×LP - studio
 Ange - Rêves Parties (2001) - 2×CD reissue
 Ange - Escale À Ch'tiland (2012) + bonus DVD
 The Animals - Love Is (1968) - 2×LP - studio
 Aphex Twin - Selected Ambient Works Vol. 2 (1994) - 3×LP, 2×CD - studio
 Aphex Twin - Drukqs (2001) - 4×LP, 2×CD - studio
 Aphrodite's Child - 666 (The Apocalypse Of John,13/18) (1972) - 2×LP, 1×CD - studio
 Apollo 440 - Dude Descending a Staircase (2003) - 2×CD - studio
 Arcade Fire - Reflektor (2013) - 2×CD - studio
 Neil Ardley, Ian Carr, Mike Gibbs & Stan Tracey - Will Power - A Shakespeare Birthday Celebration in Music (1975; 2005) - 2×LP; 2×CD reissue 
 Area - International POPular Group (2005) – 2×CD
 Argent - Argent / Ring Of Hands (2000) – 2×CD reissue
 Armand - Een Beetje Vriendelijkheid (1974) – 2×LP
 Armand - 50 Jaar (1996) – 2×CD compilation
 Arrival - The Complete Recordings of Arrival (2012) – 2×CD reissue
 Art Ensemble of Chicago - Non-Cognitive Aspects of the City (2007) – 2×CD
 Art Zoyd - Phase IV  (1982) - 2×LP
 Art Zoyd - Metropolis (2002) - 2×CD
 Art Zoyd - Eyecatcher (2011) - 2×CD
 Die Ärzte - Geräusch (2005) - 2×CD - studio
 Rick Astley - The Best of Me (2019) - 2xCD, 2xLP
 Atomic Rooster - Death Walks Behind You (1970) – 2×LP
 Atomic Rooster - Home To Roost (1977) – 2×LP
Autechre - Exai (2013) - 2×CD - studio
The Avalanches – Since I Left You (2000) – 2×LP
 Axiom Ambient - Lost in the Translation (1994) - 2×CD - studio
Axiom Funk - Funkcronomicon (1995) - 2×CD - studio
Kevin Ayers - Didn't Feel Lonely Till I Thought Of You (2004) - 2×CD
 Kevin Ayers - The BBC Sessions: 1970–1976 (2006) - 2×CD
Ayreon - Into the Electric Castle (1998) - 2×CD - studio
 Ayreon - The Human Equation (2004) - 2×CD - studio
 Ayreon - 01011001 (2008) - 2×CD - studio
Ayreon – The Theory of Everything (2013) – 2xCD – studio
Ayreon – The Source (2017) – 2xCD – studio

B
 B'z - The 7th Blues (1994) - 2×CD
 Joan Baez - Blessed Are... (1971) – 2×LP 
 Joan Baez - Any Day Now: Songs of B. Dylan (1974) – 2×LP reissue
 Joan Baez - The Country Music Album (1979) – 2×LP 
 Joan Baez - Very Early Joan (1982) – 2×LP 
 Joan Baez - Play Me Backwards (2011) – 2×CD
 Banco de Gaia - Last Train to Lhasa (1995) - 2×CD - studio
 The Band - The Last Waltz (1978) - 3×LP, 2×CD - live 
 BAP – Bess Demnähx (1983; 1991) – 2×LP; 2×CD – live
 BAP – ...affrocke!! (1993) – 2×CD – live 
 BAP – vun drinne noh drusse (2011) – 2×CD rem. + bonus CD
 Baroness - Yellow & Green (2012) - 2×CD - studio
 The Beatles - Anthology 1 (1995) - 3×LP, 2×CD - compilation
 The Beatles - Anthology 2 (1996) - 3×LP, 2×CD - compilation
 The Beatles - Anthology 3 (1996) - 3×LP, 2×CD - compilation
 The Beatles - The Beatles' Story (1964) - 2×LP, 1×CD - US
 The Beatles - The Beatles (White Album)  (1968) - 2×LP, 2×CD - studio
 The Beatles - Past Masters (1988) - 2×LP - compilation, but part of the core catalogue.
 Bee Gees - Odessa (1969) - 2×LP - studio
 Budzma The Best Rock / Budzma The Best Rock/New – 2×CD - studio
 George Benson - Livin' Inside Your Love (1977) - 2×LP - studio
 Leonard Bernstein - Wonderful Town (1998) – 2×CD
 Leonard Bernstein - West Side Story x2 (2011) – 2×CD 
 Leonard Bernstein & National Symphony Orchestra - On the Town (1997) – 2×CD
 Chuck Berry - Sweet little rock 'n roller (?) – 2×LP
 Chuck Berry - Golden Decade (1967) – 2×LP
 Chuck Berry - Golden Decade Vol.2 (1972) – 2×LP
 Chuck Berry - Chicago Golden Years – 10 (1974) – 2×LP
 Chuck Berry - Hail! Hail! Rock 'n roll (1988) – 2×LP
 Chuck Berry - Gold (2005)
 Chuck Berry, Bill Haley & Little Richard – The Kings of Rock 'n Roll (1973) – 2×LP
 Bevis Frond - New River Head (1990) - 2×CD – studio
 Bevis Frond - North Circular (1997) - 2×CD – studio
 Beyoncé - I Am... Sasha Fierce (2008) - 2×CD - studio
 Biffy Clyro - Opposites (2013) - 2×CD - studio
 Big Brother and the Holding Company - Ball & Chain (2010)
 Big K.R.I.T. - 4eva Is a Mighty Long Time (2017) - 2xCD - studio
 Bintangs - Live-File (1991) – 2×CD
 Bintangs - Genuine Bull: Deluxe Edition [remastered] (2009) – 2×CD reissue
 Frank Black - Fast Man Raider Man (2006) - 2×CD - studio
Frank Black - Teenager of the Year (1994)  - 2×CD - studio
 The Black Crowes - The southern harmony and musical companion (1992) 
 The Black Crowes - By Your Side (1999) – plus bonus cd
 The Black Crowes - The Lost Crowes (2006) 
 The Black Crowes - Freak & roll...into the fog (2006) 
 The Black Crowes - Croweology (2010)
 Black Sabbath - We Sold Our Soul For Rock and Roll (1976) 
 Black Sabbath - Live Evil (1982)
 Black Sabbath - The End (2017)
 Bluebottle Kiss - Doubt Seeds (2006) - 2×CD - studio
 The Blues Brothers - Blues Brothers (1998)
 The Blues Brothers - The Blues Brothers Complete (1998)
 Graham Bond - Solid Bond (1970) – 2×LP
 Graham Bond - This Is Graham Bond (1971) – 2×LP (unreleased)
 Bone Thugs-N-Harmony - The Art of War (1997) - 2×CD - studio
 Bongwater - Double Bummer (1988) - 2×LP, 2×CD - studio
 Boris - Dronevil (2005) - 2×CD - studio
 David Bowie - David Live (1974) - 2×LP - live
 David Bowie - Stage (1978) - 2×LP live
 Brainbox - To You (1972) – 2×LP
 Anthony Braxton - For Alto (1968) - 2×LP - studio
 Dan Ar Braz & L'Héritage des Celtes - Zenith (1998) – 2×CD 
 Jacques Brel - Ne me quitte pas (1977) – 2×LP
 Jacques Brel - De 24 Grootste Successen (1988) – 2×LP
 Jacques Brel - Jacques Brel (1990)
 Jacques Brel - Quand on n'a que l'amour (1996)
 Jacques Brel - Infiniment (2003)
 Jacques Brel - Grand Jacques: le siècle d'or (2010) 
 Jacques Brel - Des perles de pluie 1954–1960 (2011)
 Jacques Brel & François Rauber - Chansons et musiques de films (2013) 
 Brigada Victor Jara - Por Sendas, Montes e Vales (2000) – 2×CD
 Herman Brood & The Wild Romance – Herman Brood & His Wild Romance (1992) - 2×CD
 Chris Brown - Heartbreak on a Full Moon (2017) - 2xCD - studio
 Chris Brown - Indigo (2019) - 2xCD - studio
 James Brown - The Payback (1973) - studio
 James Brown - Hell (1974) - 2×LP - studio
 Pete Brown - Before Singing Lessons 1969–77 (1987) – 2×LP compilation
 Pete Brown & Piblokto! – Things May Come and Things May Go but the Art School Dance Goes on Forever (2001) - 2×CD reissue
 Pete Brown & Phil Ryan - Ardours Of The Lost Rake / Coals To Jerusalem (2013) – 2×CD reissue
 Jackson Browne & David Lindley - Love Is Strange (2010) - 2×CD
 Dave Brubeck - A Place In Time (?) – 2×LP
 Dave Brubeck - 80th Birthday Celebration (2000) – 2×CD
 Dave Brubeck - Time Out: Legacy Edition [+ bonus DVD] (2009) – 2×CD + DVD reissue
 Dave Brubeck - The definitive Dave Brubeck on Fantasy, Concord Jazz and Telarc (2010) – 2×CD reissue 
 Dave Brubeck - Dave digs Disney: Legacy Edition [remastered] (2011) – 2×CD reissue
 Dave Brubeck & Walter Cronkite - Private Brubeck Remembers (2004) – 2×CD
 Jack Bruce - Cities Of The Heart (1994) 
 Roy Buchanan – Sweet Dreams: The Anthology (1992) 
 Roy Buchanan – After hours : The early years – 1957–1962 recordings (2016) 
 Roy Buchanan – Loading zone / You're not alone  (2017) – remastered 
 Roy Buchanan – Live at Town Hall 1974 (2018)
 Buena Vista Social Club - Buena Vista Social Club at Carnegie Hall (2008)
 Kenny Burrell - Ellington is Forever, Vol.2 (1975) – 2×LP 
 Kenny Burrell - At the Village Vanguard (1999) – 2×CD reissue
 Kenny Burrell - Stolen Moments (2000/2002)
 Kenny Burrell - Introducing Kenny Burrell: First Blue Note sessions (2000) 
 Kenny Burrell & John Coltrane - Kenny Burrell and John Coltrane (1976) – 2×LP
 Kate Bush - Aerial (2005) - 2×CD - studio
 Jerry Butler - Spice of Life (1972) - 2×LP - studio?
 Charlie Byrd - Latin Byrd (1973) – 2×LP compilation
 The Byrds - (Untitled) (1970) - 2×LP - live/studio
 David Byrne & Fatboy Slim - Here Lies Love - (2010) - 2×CD - studio

C
 Cabaret Voltaire - The Conversation (1994) - 2×CD - studio
 Caesars - Strawberry Weed (2008) - 2×CD - studio
 Cactus - Fully Unleashed: The Live Gigs (2004)
 Café Tacvba - Revés/Yo Soy (2000) - 2×CD - studio
 Can - Tago Mago (1973) - 2×LP - studio
 Canned Heat - Livin' the Blues (1999) - 2×CD 
 Canned Heat & John Lee Hooker - Hooker 'n Heat (2002) - 2×CD
 Canned Heat & Henry Vestine - Human Condition Revisited – I Used To Be Mad (2013)
 Jerry Cantrell - Degradation Trip Volumes 1 & 2 (2002) - 2×CD - studio
 Captain Beefheart and his Magic Band - Trout Mask Replica (1969) - 2×LP - studio
 Caravan - Travelling Ways (2001)
 Caravan - In The Land Of Grey And Pink: 40th Anniversary Edition (2011) + bonus DVD 
 Wendy Carlos - Sonic Seasonings (1972) - 2×LP - studio
 Caroliner (as Caroliner Rainbow Grace Blocks Used in the Placement of the Personality) - Rings on the Awkward Shadow (1994) - 2×LP - studio
 Johnny Cash - Sings the Ballads of the True West (1965) - studio
 Johnny Cash - The Gospel Road (1973) - 2×LP - studio/soundtrack
 Johnny Cash - A Believer Sings the Truth (1979) - 2×LP - studio
 Ca$his - "Loose Cannon" (2008) - 2×LP - mixtape
 The Cats - Times Where When (1972) – 2×LP
 The Cats - 10 Jaar The Cats (1974) – 2×LP
 The Cats - The Cats (1975) – 2×LP
 The Cats - Alle 40 Goed (2010) 
 The Cats - The Golden Years of Dutch Pop Music (2016) 
 Eugene Chadbourne & John Zorn (1978) - School - 2×CD - studio
 Paul Chambers & John Coltrane - High Step (1975) – 2×LP
 Chamillionaire - Mixtape Messiah (2004) - 3×CD - mixtape
 Ray Charles - Collection portrait de Ray Charles ( ? ) – 2×LP compilation
 Ray Charles - The Fantastic Ray Charles ( ? ) – 2×LP compilation
 Ray Charles - 25th Anniversary in Show Business
 Ray Charles - Focus on Ray Charles
 Ray Charles - Blues & Jazz (1994)
 Ray Charles & Milt Jackson - Soul Brothers – Soul Meeting (1989)
 Ray Charles & Quincy Jones - Genius + Soul = Jazz. Complete 1956–1960 sessions with Quincy Jones (2011)
 Ray Charles & Cleo Laine - Porgy & Bess
 Cody ChesnuTT - The Headphone Masterpiece (2002) - 2×CD - studio
 Chicago - The Chicago Transit Authority (1969) - 2×LP (debut album) - studio
 Chicago - Chicago (1970), later known as Chicago II - 2×LP - studio
 Chicago - Chicago III (1971) - 2×LP - studio
 Chicago - Chicago VII (1974) - 2×LP - studio
 The Chocolate Watch Band - Melts In Your Brain... Not On Your (2005) – 2×CD reissue
 Gary Clark Jr. - Live (2014)
 The Clash - London Calling (1979) - 2×LP - studio
 The Clash - Sandinista! (1980) - 3×LP - studio
 Andrew Dice Clay - The Day the Laughter Died (1990) - 2×CD - live
 Coldplay - Everyday Life (2019) - studio
 Ornette Coleman - In All Languages (1987) - 2×LP - studio
 Colosseum - Valentyne Suite (2004) – 2×CD reissue
 John Coltrane - The Stardust Session (1975) – 2×LP
 John Coltrane - The Other Village Vanguard Tapes (1976) – 2×LP
 John Coltrane - Wheelin'  (1977) – 2×LP
 John Coltrane - Afro Blue Impressions (1977) – 2×LP 
 John Coltrane - To The Beat Of A Different Drum (1978) – 2×LP
 John Coltrane - On A Misty Night (1978) – 2×LP
 John Coltrane - Trane's Modes (1979) – 2×LP
 John Coltrane - Rain or Shine (1980) – 2×LP
 John Coltrane - Dakar (1981) – 2×LP
 John Coltrane - The Bethlehem Years (1987) – 2×CD reissue
 John Coltrane - Visit to Scandinavia – 1962 (2011) – 2×CD reissue
 John Coltrane - Rhapsody (2011) – 2×CD reissue
 John Coltrane & Freddie Hubbard & Eric Dolphy & McCoy Tyner & Art Davis & Reggie Workman & Elvin Jones - The Complete Africa / Brass Sessions (1995) – 2×CD reissue 
 John Coltrane & McCoy Tyner & Jimmy Garrison & Elvin Jones - Ballads: Deluxe Edition (2005) – 2×CD reissue
 John Coltrane & McCoy Tyner & Jimmy Garrison & Elvin Jones - One Down, One Up – at Half Note (2005) – 2×CD reissue 
 Country Joe McDonald - Into The Fray (1981) – 2×LP reissue
 Country Joe and the Fish - Life And Times Of (1971) – 2×LP
 Country Joe and the Fish - Electric Music for the Mind and Body (2013) – 2×CD reissue
 Country Joe and the Fish - I-Feel-Like-I'm-Fixin'-to-Die (2013) – 2×CD reissue
 Kevin Coyne - Marjory Razorblade (1973) - 2×LP - studio
 Kevin Coyne - In Living Black And White (1976) – 2×LP
 Kevin Coyne - Sanity Stomp (1980) – 2×LP
 Kevin Coyne - Knocking On Your Brain (1997) – 2×CD
 Cream - Wheels of Fire (1968) - 2×LP - studio/live
 Cream - Disraeli Gears: Deluxe Edition (2004; 2011)
 Jim Croce - The Faces I've Been (1975) – 2×LP
 Jim Croce - You Don't Mess Around with Jim (2006)
 Crosby & Nash - Crosby & Nash (2004)
 David Cross - Shut Up You Fucking Baby! (2002)
 Cuby + Blizzards - Groeten uit Grollo / Desolation (1970) – 2×LP reissue
 Cuby + Blizzards - 3 Originals + album Sometimes (2009)
 The Cure - Kiss Me, Kiss Me, Kiss Me (1987) - 2×LP - studio
 The Cure - Greatest Hits (2001) - 2xLP (2017 Record Store Day release)
 Cypress Hill - Skull & Bones (2000) - 2×CD - studio

D
 George Dalaras - Tribute to International Cinema (1996) – 2×CD
 George Dalaras - The Colours of Time; Vol. 1 (2001) – 2×CD
 George Dalaras - The Colours of Time; Vol. 2 (2001) – 2×CD
 George Dalaras - A Tribute to Markos Vamvakaris (2004) – 2×CD
 George Dalaras & Vassilis Papakonstantinou - St. Attikon (1991) – 2×CD
 George Dalaras & Mikis Theodorakis - Romiosini / Axion Esti (2008) – 2×CD reissue
 Dâm-Funk - Toeachizown (2009) - 2×CD, 5×LP – studio
 The Damned - The Black Album (1980) - 2×LP - studio
 The Damned - The light of the end of the... (1990) 
 The Damned - Play it at your sister + bonus cd (2005)
 Daniel Amos - Mr. Buechner's Dream (2001) - 2×CD - studio
 Wolfgang Dauner - Changes / Zeitläufe (2010) – 2×CD remastered
 Wolfgang Dauner - One Night in '88 / Pas de Trois (2010) – 2×CD remastered 
 Miles Davis - Bitches Brew (1970) - 2×LP - studio
 Miles Davis - Live-Evil (1971) - studio/live
 Miles Davis - Black Beauty: Miles Davis at Fillmore West (1973/1997) – 2×LP; 2×CD reissue
 Miles Davis - Dark Magus (1974) - 2×LP - live
 Miles Davis - Big Fun (1974) - 2×LP - compilation
 Miles Davis - Get Up With It (1974) - 2×LP - compilation
 Miles Davis - Agharta (1975) - live
 Miles Davis - Pangaea (1975) - live
 Miles Davis & John Coltrane - With John Coltrane (1974) – 2×LP compilation
 deadmau5 - while(1<2) (2014) – 2×CD - studio
 Death Grips - The Powers That B (2015) – 2×CD
 Deep Purple - Come Taste The Band: 35th Anniversary edition [remastered] (2010)
 Deep Purple - Days May Come And Days May Go: the California Rehearsals June 1975 (2013)
 Deep Purple - The Battle Rages On (2014)
 Deep Purple - Made in Japan [+ extra tracks] (2014)
 Deerhunter - Microcastle/Weird Era Cont. (2008) - studio
 Derek and the Dominos - Layla and Other Assorted Love Songs (1970) (debut album) - studio
 Al Di Meola - Splendido Hotel (1980) - 2×LP - studio
 Bo Diddley, Little Walter, Muddy Waters & Howlin' Wolf - Super Blues Session (1976) – 2×LP 
 Ani DiFranco - Revelling/Reckoning (2001) - 2×CD - studio
 Dio - At Donington UK: Live 1983 & 1987 (2010) - 2×CD
 The Diplomats - Diplomatic Immunity (2002) - studio
 DJ Khaled - Grateful (2017) - 2xCD - studio
 DJ Rap - Touching Bass (2002) - 2×CD 
 Doe Maar - Lijf Aan Lijf (1991) – 2×CD
 Doe Maar - Alles (1999) – 2×CD
 Klaus Doldinger + Passport - Lifelike (1980; 1991) – 2×LP; 2×CD
 Donovan - A Gift from a Flower to a Garden (1968) - 2×LP - studio
 Donovan - H.M.S. Donovan (1971) - 2×LP - studio
 The Doobie Brothers - The Doobie Brothers / Toulouse Street (2011) – 2×CD reissue
 The Doobie Brothers - The Captain And Me / What Were Once Vices Are Now Habits (2011) – 2×CD reissue
 Johnny van Doorn - Oorlog en Pap (2001) – 2×CD reissue
 Dr. Feelgood - As It Happens (1979) – 2×LP
 Drake - Scorpion (2018) - 2xCD - studio
 Dream Theater - Six Degrees of Inner Turbulence (2002) - 2×CD - studio
 Dream Theater - The Astonishing (2016) - 2×CD - studio
 Drive-By Truckers - Southern Rock Opera (2001) - 2×CD - studio
 Bob Dylan - Blonde on Blonde (1966) - studio
 Bob Dylan - Self Portrait (1970) - studio
 Bob Dylan - The Basement Tapes (1975) - studio
 Bob Dylan & Frank Sinatra - Dylan meets Sinatra: The Album (2015)
 Bob Dylan - Rough and Rowdy Ways (2020) - studio

E
 E-40 - The Element of Surprise (1998) - 2×CD - studio
 Eagles - Eagles Live (1980) - live
 Eagles - The Very Best of The Eagles (2003) - studio
 Eagles - Long Road Out of Eden (2007) - studio
 The Early November - The Mother, the Mechanic, and the Path (2006) - 3×CD - studio
 Earth & Fire - 3 Originals (1999) – 2×CD reissue 
 Earth, Wind & Fire - Faces (1980) - 2×LP - studio
 Eels - Blinking Lights and Other Revelations (2005) - studio
 8Ball & MJG - Lost (8Ball album) (1998) studio
 Elastic No-No Band - Fustercluck!!! (2010) - 2×CD - studio
 Electric Light Orchestra - Out of the Blue (1977) - 2×LP - studio
 Electronic - Electronic (2013) – 2×CD reissue
 Embryo - Invisible Documents (1999)
 Embryo - La Blama Sparozzi (2000)
 Embryo - One Night at the Joan Miró Foundation (2000)
 Emerson, Lake & Palmer - Works Volume I (1977) - 2×LP - studio
 Brian Eno - Music for Onmyo-Ji (2000) - 2×CD - studio
 Entombed - DCLXVI: To Ride Shoot Straight and Speak the Truth (1997)
 Esham - Judgement Day (1992) - studio
 Esbjörn Svensson Trio - Live in Hamburg (2007)
 Esbjörn Svensson Trio - Live in London (2005 / 2018)
 The Ex - Blueprints for a Blackout  (1984) - 2×LP - studio
 The Ex - Joggers and Smoggers (1989) - 2×LP, 2×CD - studio
 The Ex - Turn (2004) - 2×CD - studio
 The Ex + Guests - Instant (1995) - 2×CD - studio

F
 Family - Fearless / It's Only A Movie (1989) – 2×CD reissue 
 Chris Farlowe - Out Of The Blue / Born Again (1992) – 2×CD reissue
 Fat Mattress - Magic Forest: the Anthology (2006) – 2×CD – compilation
 Faust - Faust is Last (2010) – 2×CD
 José Feliciano - Alive Alive-O! (1969) - 2×LP
 Maynard Ferguson - Color Me Wild (1974) - 2×LP
 Maynard Ferguson - Conducts the Birdland Dreamland (1982) - 2×LP
 Maynard Ferguson - M.F. Horn; M.F. Horn 2; M.F. Horn 3 (remastered) (2013) - 2×CD reissue
 Maynard Ferguson - Primal Scream; New Vintage; Carnival (remastered) (2014) - 2×CD reissue
 Léo Ferré - Verlaine et Rimbaud (1964) - 2×LP
 Léo Ferré - Léo Ferré chante Baudelaire (1967) - 2×LP
 Léo Ferré - Amour Anarchie (1970) - 2×LP
 Léo Ferré - L'Opéra du pauvre (1983) - 4×LP
 Léo Ferré - On n'est pas sérieux quand on a dix-sept ans (1987) - 2×LP
 The Firesign Theatre - Dear Friends (1972) - 2×LP
 The Firesign Theatre - Forward Into The Past (1976) - 2×LP
 Fish - Bouillabaisse (2005) - 2×CD
 Ella Fitzgerald - Ella Fitzgerald Sings the Cole Porter Songbook (1956)
 Ella Fitzgerald - Ella Fitzgerald Sings the Rodgers & Hart Songbook (1956)
 Ella Fitzgerald - Ella Fitzgerald Sings the Duke Ellington Songbook (1957)
 Ella Fitzgerald - Ella Fitzgerald Sings the Irving Berlin Songbook (1958)
 Ella Fitzgerald - Ella Fitzgerald Sings the George and Ira Gershwin Songbook (1959)
 Ella Fitzgerald - Ella Fitzgerald Sings the Harold Arlen Songbook (1961)
 Five Finger Death Punch - "The Wrong Side of Heaven and The Righteous Side of Hell, Volumes 1 and 2"
 The Flaming Lips - Zaireeka (1997) - 4×CD - studio (single album, four different mixes)
 Flairck - Flairck – Alive (1990) – 2×CD
 Flairck - 3 Originals (2005) – 2×CD re-release
 Flairck - Variaties op een Dame / Gevecht met de Engel (2014) – 2×CD re-release
 Fleetwood Mac - Tusk (1979) - 2×LP
 Fleetwood Mac - The Vaudeville Years (1998)
 Fleetwood Mac - Show-Biz Blues (1999)
 The Flower Kings - Stardust We Are (1997) - 2×CD
 The Flower Kings - Flower Power (1999) - 2×CD
 The Flower Kings - Alive on Planet Earth (2000) - 2×CD
 The Flower Kings - Unfold the Future (2002) - 2×CD
 The Flower Kings - Meet the Flower Kings (2003) - 2×CD
 The Flower Kings - Paradox Hotel (2006) - 2×CD
 Flower Travellin' Band - Make Up (1973) - 2×LP
 The Flying Burrito Brothers - Close Up the Honky Tonks (1974) - 2×LP
 Focus - Focus III (1972) - 2×LP
 Dan Fogelberg - The Innocent Age (1981)
 Foghat - In the Mood / Zig Zag Walk (2000) – 2×CD reissue
 Foghat - Tight Shoes / Girls To Chat (2000) – 2×CD reissue
 Foghat - Road Cases (2001)
 Foo Fighters - In Your Honor (2005) - 2×CD
 Forest - Forest / Full Circle (2011) – 2×CD compilation reissue
 Peter Frampton - Frampton Comes Alive! (1976) - 2×LP
 Frankie Goes to Hollywood - Welcome to the Pleasuredome (1984) - 2×LP, 1×CD (debut album)
 Free - Fire and Water: Deluxe Edition (2010)
 Freedom - Nerosubianco (2002) – 2×LP + bonus tracks reissue 
 Robert Fripp & Brian Eno - Beyond Even 1992–2006 (2007) - 2×CD (limited ed.)
 Robert Fripp & Brian Eno - (No Pussyfooting) (2008) - 2×CD reissue
 Fred Frith - The Technology of Tears (1988) - 2×LP
 Fred Frith - Eleventh Hour (2005) - 2×CD 
 Fred Frith & Henry Kaiser - Friends & Enemies (1999) – 2×CD
 Edgar Froese - Ages (1978) - 2×LP 
 Frumpy – Live (1973 / 2009) – 2×LP / 2×CD re-release
 The Fugs - The Real Woodstock Festival '94 (1995) – 2×CD
 Fungus - The Fungus Collection (2000) - 2×CD reissue
 Funkadelic - America Eats Its Young (1972) - 2×LP
 The Future Sound of London - Lifeforms (1994) - 2×CD

G
 Gang of Youths - Go Farther in Lightness (2017)
 Carlos Gardel – 30 Exitos Para El Recuerdo (1985)- 2×LP
 Carlos Gardel – 38 chefs-d'oeuvre (1996) 
 The Gathering - How To Measure A Planet? (1998) - 2×CD
 Marvin Gaye - Here, My Dear (1978) - 2xLP
 The Gazette - Division (2012) - 2×CD
 Eelco Gelling - The Missing Link (2000) – 2×CD
 Genesis - The Lamb Lies Down on Broadway (1974) - 2×LP
 Stan Getz & Dave Brubeck - Jazz Summit (1972) – 2×LP
 Gilberto Gil - A Arte de Gilberto Gil (1985) – 2×LP – compilation
 Gilberto Gil - Sou Louco Por Você (2005)
 Gillan - Double Trouble (1989) - 2×LP
 David Gilmour - Live in Gdansk (2008) - 4xLP, 2xCD
 David Gilmour - Live at Pompeii (2017) - 4xLP, 2xCD
 Glass Hammer - The Inconsolable Secret (2005)
 Godspeed You! Black Emperor - Lift Your Skinny Fists Like Antennas To Heaven (2000)
 Golden Earring - On the Double (1969) – 2×LP
 Golden Earring - The Complete Naked Truth (1998)
 Golden Earring - 3 Originals (1999)
 Golden Earring - Last Blast of the Century (2000)
 Golden Earring - Fully Naked (2012)
 Golden Earring - The Long Versions (2013)
 Gong - Gong est Mort, Vive Gong (1977) - 2×LP
 Robert Gordon, Link Wray & his Wraymen - That's Rock 'n' Roll (1980) – 2×LP 
 Gracious! - Gracious! / This is... Gracious!! (1995) – 2×CD – reissued
 Grateful Dead - Live/Dead (1969) - 2×LP studio/live
 Grateful Dead - Grateful Dead (1971) - 2×LP
 Grateful Dead - Europe '72 (1972) - 3×LP, 2×CD
 Grateful Dead - Dead Set (1981) - 2×LP
 Grateful Dead - Reckoning (1981) - 2×LP
 Grateful Dead - Without a Net (1990) - 2×CD
 Grateful Dead - Rocking the Cradle: Egypt 1978 (2008) - 2×CD w/ bonus DVD 
 Great Guitars - At The Winery / At Charlie's Georgetown (2001) – 2×CD reissue
 Peter Green - Reaching The Cold 100 (2003)
 Peter Green & Fleetwood Mac - Jumping At Shadows / The Blues Years (2007)
 Greenslade - Feathered Friends (2006) – 2×CD
 Grobschnitt - Last Party Live (1990; reissued 2015) – 2×CD
 Raymond van het Groenewoud - Mr.Raymond / Voor de Fans (2005) – 2×CD reissue
 Raymond van het Groenewoud - Kamiel in België / Nooit Meer Drinken (2011) – 2×CD reissue
 Boudewijn de Groot - 5 Jaar Hits (1971) – 2×LP compilation
 Boudewijn de Groot - Dubbel, Twee (1973) – 2×LP reissue
 Boudewijn de Groot - 3 Originals: Waar ik woon en wie ik ben / Van een afstand / Maalstroom (2009) – 2×CD reissue
 The Groundhogs - Best of the Groundhogs 1969–1972 (1974) 2xLP compilation
 The Groundhogs - The Classic British Rock Scene (1975) – 2xLP compilation 
 The Groundhogs - Moving fast – Standing still (1986) – 2xLP compilation
 The Groundhogs - Groundhogs live (1999) 
 The Groundhogs - 3744 James Road (2001) – 2xCD compilation
 The Groundhogs - 54146 (2001) – 2xCD compilation 
 The Groundhogs - Joker's Grave (2005) – 2xCD reissue
 Guns N' Roses - Use Your Illusion I (1991) - 2×LP, 1×CD - studio
 Guns N' Roses - Use Your Illusion II (1991) - 2×LP, 1×CD - studio
 Guru Guru - Der Elektrolurch (1974) – 2×LP
 Arlo Guthrie & Pete Seeger - Precious Friend (1990) - 2×CD reissue
 Buddy Guy - Chicago Golden Years Vol.6 (1988) – 2×LP
 Buddy Guy - Rhythm & Blues (2013) - 2×CD
 Buddy Guy & Otis Rush & Magic Sam - Snakebite (2009) – 2×CD

H
 Steve Hackett - The Tokyo Tapes (1998) 
 Steve Hackett - Out of the Tunnel's Mouth (2010) 
 Steve Hackett - Live Rails (2011)
 Steve Hackett - Beyond the Shrouded Horizon (2011)
 Steve Hackett - Genesis Revisited II; Vol.2 (2012) – limited edition
 Nina Hagen - Om Namah Shivay (2002)
 Nina Hagen Band - Nina Hagen Band / Unbehagen (1989) – 2×LP, 2×CD reissue
 Half Japanese - 1/2 Gentlemen/Not Beasts (1980) (debut album)
 HammerFall - One Crimson Night (2003)
 Hampton Grease Band - Music to Eat (1971) (debut album)
 Tim Hardin - Hang On To A Dream: the Verve Recordings (1997) - 2×CD
 Harmonium - L'Heptade (1976) - 2×LP
 Ben Harper - Both Sides Of The Gun (2006)
 Roy Harper - Born in Captivity / Work of Heart (1988) – 2×CD reissue
 Roy Harper - Counter Culture (2005)
 Roy Harper - Songs of Love and Loss (2011)
 George Harrison - All Things Must Pass (1970) - 3×LP; 2001 remastered version 2×CD
 Have A Nice Life – Deathconsciousness (2008)
 Hawkwind - Space Ritual (1973)
 Darren Hayes - This Delicate Thing We've Made (2007)
 Isaac Hayes - Black Moses (1971)
 Heaven - Brass Rock 1 (1971)
 Heldon - It's Always Rock and Roll (1975) - 2×LP
 Helloween - Keeper of the Seven Keys – The Legacy (2005) - 2×CD
 Helloween - United Alive in Madrid (2019) - 3×CD
 Help Yourself - Strange Affair / Beware of the Shadow (1997) – 2×LP re-release 
 Help Yourself - Strange Affair / The Return of Ken Whaley / Happy Days (1999) – 2×CD re-release
 Jimi Hendrix - Winterland Night (2005) – 2×CD
 The Jimi Hendrix Experience - Electric Ladyland (1968) - 2×LP 
 Henry Cow – Concerts (1976; 2006) – 2×LP;2×CD reissue 
 Steve Hillage - For To Next / And Not Or (1983) – 2×LP reissue 
 Arno Hintjens - Charles Ernest (2002)
 Arno Hintjens - Arno Brusseld: Life To The Beat (2010) – 2×LP
 Arno Hintjens - Ratata / Charlatan (2011) – 2×CD reissue
 Bruce Hornsby - Here Come The Noise Makers (2001) - 2×CD
 Bruce Hornsby - Bride of the Noisemakers (2011) - 2×CD
 Howard Morrison Quartet - The Fabulous Howard Morrison Quartet (January 1965) - 2×LP
 The Housemartins - London 0 Hull 4 (2009) - 2×CD remastered deluxe ed.
 Freddie Hubbard - Riding High / Solo Brother / Professor Jive (1990) – 2×CD
 Humble Pie - Eat It (1973) - 2×LP
 Humble Pie - Natural Born Bugie (2000) - 2×CD
 Humble Pie - Home and Away (2004) - 2×CD
 Hannah Montana/Miley Cyrus-Hannah Montana 2/Meet Miley Cyrus (2007) - 2×LP
 Ian Hunter - The Ballad of Ian Hunter and Mott the Hoople (1979) - 2×LP
 Ian Hunter - Welcome to the Club (1980) -2xLP
 Hüsker Dü - Zen Arcade (1984) - 2×LP
 Hüsker Dü - Warehouse: Songs and Stories (1987) - 2×LP

I
 The Incredible String Band - Wee Tam and the Big Huge (1968) - 2×LP
 The Incredible String Band - U (1970) - 2×LP
 Indochine - Alice & June (2005) 2xCD (limited edition)
 Iron Butterfly - Ball / Metamorphosis (1974) – 2×LP reissue
 Iron Maiden - Live After Death (1985)
 Iron Maiden - Death on the Road (2004)
 Iron Maiden - Flight 666 (2009) - 2×CD
 Iron Maiden - The Book of Souls (2015) - 2×CD – Studio
 Iron Maiden - Senjutsu (2021) - 2xCD - Studio
 The Isley Brothers - Timeless (1978) - 2×LP
 The Isley Brothers - Winner Takes All (1979) - 2×LP
 IQ - Subterranea (1997) - 2×CD

J
 Joe Jackson - Live 1980/86 (1988) – 2×LP
 Joe Jackson - This Is It: the A&M Years 1979–1989 (1997)
 Joe Jackson - Greatest Hits And More (2001)
 Joe Jackson - Night and Day (2003) – 2×CD deluxe edition
 Joe Jackson - The Ultimate Collection (2003)
 Joe Jackson - Gold (2008)
 Joe Jackson - At the BBC (2009) – live
 Joe Jackson - Live at Rockpalast (2012)
 Joe Jackson - Afterlive (2014) – live compilation 
 Michael Jackson - Dangerous (1991) - 2×LP, 1×CD
 Michael Jackson - HIStory (1995) - 3×LP, 2×CD
 Michael Jackson - The Essential Michael Jackson (2005) – 2×CD
 Tommy James and the Shondells - It's A New Vibration (1998) – 2×CD
 Tommy James and the Shondells - French 60's ep & sp collection (2000) – 2×CD reissue
 Tommy James and the Shondells - Hanky Panky / It's Only Love / I Think We're Alone Now (2013) – 2×CD reissue
 Jandek - Newcastle Sunday (2006) - 2×CD
 Jandek - Glasgow Monday: The Cell (2006) - 2×CD
 Jane - Rock on Brain (1980) – 2×LP compilation
 Keith Jarrett - The Köln Concert (1975)
 Keith Jarrett - Book of Ways (1987)
 Keith Jarrett - My Foolish Heart (2007) – live
 Jay-Z - The Blueprint 2: The Gift & the Curse (2002) - 2×CD
 Jefferson Airplane - Flight Log (1977) - 2×LP
 Jefferson Airplane - 1600 Fulton Street (1987) - 2×LP
 Jefferson Airplane - The Essential (2005) – 2×CD compilation
 Jefferson Airplane - Last Flight (2007) – 2×CD live
 Jefferson Airplane - The Woodstock Experience (2009) – 2×CD live / reissue
 Jefferson Starship - Across The Sea Of Suns (2002) – 2×CD reissue
 Jethro Tull - Living in the Past (1972) - 2×LP
 Jethro Tull - Bursting Out (1978) - 2×LP
 Jhené Aiko - Trip (2017) - 2xCD - studio
 Billy Joel - Songs in the Attic / Piano Man (?) – 2×LP
 Billy Joel - Streetlife Serenade / 52nd Street  (?) – 2×LP
 Billy Joel - Greatest Hits, Vol. 1 & 2 (1985) – 2×LP
 Billy Joel - Kohuept – Live in Leningrad 87 (1987) – 2×LP
 Billy Joel - The Bridge / Glass Houses (1990) – 2×CD compilation reissue
 Billy Joel - River of Dreams / Five Live (1994) – 2×CD compilation reissue
 Billy Joel - The Ultimate Collection (2000) – studio + live compilation
 Billy Joel - 2000 Years: The Millenium Concert (2001) – 2×CD live
 Billy Joel - 12 Gardens: Live (2006) – 2×CD
 Billy Joel - The Stranger: 30th Anniversary edition [+ bonus DVD] (2008)
 Billy Joel - The Stranger: The original album; Live at Carnegie Hall 1977 (2008) 
 Billy Joel - Live at Shea Stadium [+ bonus DVD] (2011)
 Billy Joel - Piano Man (2011) – 2×CD live reissue
 Elton John - Goodbye Yellow Brick Road (1973) - 2×LP, 1×CD
 Elton John -Blue Moves (1976)
 Elton John - Here and There (1976) (1995 expanded version) - 2×CD
 Elton John - Greatest Hits: 1970–2002 (2002) – 2×CD 
 John's Children – The complete John's Children (2002) – compilation reissue 
 Cody Johnson – Human: The Double Album (2022) – 2xCD studio 
 Janis Joplin - In Concert (1972) - 2×LP
 Janis Joplin - Pearl / I Got Dem Ol' Kozmic Blues Again Mama (1988) – 2×CD reissue
 Janis Joplin - Anthology (1990)
 Janis Joplin - Janis / Early Performances (1993) – 2×CD reissue 
 Janis Joplin - Pearl: Legacy Edition (2009) – 2×CD reissue
 Janis Joplin - The Essential Janis Joplin (2009)
 Janis Joplin - The Woodstock Experience (2009) – 2×CD, limited edition
 Janis Joplin - Cry Baby: The Ultimate Collection [+ bonus DVD] (2009)
 Janis Joplin - Absolute Janis (2010) – 2×CD – compilation
 Journey - Captured (1981) - 2×LP
 Judas Priest - Priest...Live! (1987) - 2×LP
 Judas Priest - Metal Works '73–'93 (1993) - 2×CD
 Judas Priest - Nostradamus (2008) - 2×CD/LP
 Junkie XL - Radio JXL: A Broadcast From the Computer Hell Cabin
 Johannes - Johannes (2006) - 2×CD

K
 Kaleidoscope - The Fairfield Parlour Years: White Faced Lady / From Home to Home (2000) – 2×CD reissue
 Kaleidoscope - Further Reflections (2012)
 Kansas - Two for the Show (1978)
 Paul Kantner - A Guide through the Chaos (2000)
 Paul Kantner - A Martian Christmas (2013)
 John Kay & Steppenwolf - Live at 25 (1996)
 Kayak - Chance for a Live Time (2001) - 2×CD
 Kayak - Greatest Hits and More (2001)
 Kayak - 3 Originals (2002) – 2×CD compilation reissue
 Kayak - Nostradamus - The Fate of Man (2005)
 Kayak - Letters From Utopia (2009)
 Kayak - The Anniversary Concert - Live in Paradiso (2009)
 Kayak - Eyewitness / Merlin (2013) – 2×CD compilation reissue
 Kayak - Cleopatra: the Crown of Isis (2014)
 Kayak - The Golden Years of Dutch Pop Music (2015) – 2xCD compilation
 Kazik - Czterdziesty pierwszy (2004) - 2×CD
 Paul Kelly - Gossip - (1986) - 2×CD
 R. Kelly - R. (1998) - 2×CD
 R. Kelly - Happy People/U Saved Me (2004) - 2×CD
 Kensington - Vultures (2013) – w/ bonus live cd 
 Toby Keith - 35 Biggest Hits (2008) – 2×CD
 Kid Cudi - Speedin' Bullet 2 Heaven (2015) – 2×CD
 Freddie King - King Of The Blues (1995)
 Freddie King - Texas In My Blues (2013)
 Freddie King - Selected sides 1960–1962: the Texas Cannonball (remastered) (2014)
 King Crimson - Absent Lovers: Live in Montreal (1998) - 2×CD
 The Kinks - Everybody's in Show-Biz (1972)
 The Kinks - Kronikles (1972) - 2×LP
 The Kinks - Preservation: Act 2 (1974)
 The Kinks - One for the Road (1980)
 Kin Ping Meh - Concrete (1976) – 2×LP
 Kin Ping Meh - Hazy Age On Stage (1991) – 2×LP 
 Richard H. Kirk - Time High Fiction (1983) - 2×LP, 2×CD
 Kiss - Alive! (1975) - 2×LP
 Kiss - The Originals (1976) - 3×LP
 Kiss - Alive II (1977) - 2×LP
 Kiss - Double Platinum (1978) - 2×LP
 Kiss - KISS Symphony: Alive IV (2003)
 Kitaro - An Ancient Journey (2001) - 2×CD
 Klute - Lie, Cheat & Steal (2003) - 2×CD
 The Knife - Tomorrow, In a Year (2010) - 2×CD
 Mark Knopfler - Privateering (album) (2013)
 Koda Kumi - Universe (2010)
 Ricky Koole - Harmonium Live (2009)
 Al Kooper - Easy Does It (1970)
 Al Kooper - Al's Big Deal – Unclaimed Freight (1975) - 2×LP
 Alexis Korner - Alexis Korner and...1961–1972 (1986) – 2×LP – compilation
 Alexis Korner - Kornerstoned : The Alexis Korner Anthology 1954–1983 (2006) – 2×CD 
 Alexis Korner - Easy Rider: Cool, calm & collected... the founding father of British blues (2012) – 2×CD – compilation
 Alexis Korner & Friends - The Party Album (1979) – 2×LP 
 Kraan - Kraan Live (1975) – 2×LP
 Kraan - Starportrait (1978) – 2×LP, compilation
 Kraan - 2 Schallplatten (1983) – 2×LP re-issue
 Kraan - Live 88 (1988) – 2×LP
 Kraan - Kraan / Wintrup (2011) – 2×CD compilation re-issue
 Kraftwerk - Kraftwerk 2 (1973) - 2×LP U.K. reissue
 Kraftwerk - Doppelalbum (1976) - 2×LP compilation
 Kraftwerk – The Mix (1991) 2xLP
 Kraftwerk - Minimum-Maximum (2005) - 2×CD – live
 Kramer - The Guilt Trip (1992) - 2×CD
 Alison Krauss & Union Station - Live (2002) - 2×CD
 Krayzie Bone - Thug Mentality 1999 (1999) - 2×CD
 Krokodil - Sweat & Swim (1973; 2015) – 2×LP; 2×CD remastered reissue
 Kronos Quartet - The Complete Landmark Sessions (1999) - 2×CD
 Kruder & Dorfmeister - The K & D Sessions (1998) - 4×LP, 2×CD
 Kurupt – Kuruption! (1998) - 2×CD

L
 Ladysmith Black Mambazo - Gospel Songs (2001) 
 Ladysmith Black Mambazo - The Ultimate Collection (2007)
 Ladysmith Black Mambazo - The Pure and the Golden (2012)
 Ladysmith Black Mambazo - Ladysmith Black Mambazo and Friends (2012)
 Laibach - Baptism (1986) - 2×LP
 Lambchop - Aw Cmon/No You Cmon (2004) – 2×CD
 Kendrick Lamar - Mr. Morale & the Big Steppers (2022) - 2×CD
 Miranda Lambert — The Weight of These Wings (2016) 2×CD 
 Bill Laswell - Hear No Evil (2009) – 2×CD
 Gordon Lightfoot- Gord's Gold (1975)
 LCD Soundsystem - LCD Soundsystem (2005)
 LCD Soundsystem - Sound of Silver (2007) – 2×LP
 LCD Soundsystem - This Is Happening (2010) – 2×LP
 LCD Soundsystem - American Dream (2017) – 2×LP
Led Zeppelin - Physical Graffiti (1975)
 Led Zeppelin - The Song Remains the Same (1976)
 Led Zeppelin - Remasters (1990) – 2×CD compilation
 Led Zeppelin - Boxed Set 2 (1993) – 2×CD compilation reissue
 Led Zeppelin - BBC Sessions (1997) – live
 Led Zeppelin - Mothership (2007) – 2×CD remastered compilation
 Led Zeppelin - Celebration Day: Recorded live December 10, 2007 O2 Arena, London [+ bonus DVD's] (2012)
 Alvin Lee - The Anthology; Vol.2 (2013)
 Alvin Lee - The Anthology (2013)
 Alvin Lee - In Fight (2013)
 Thijs van Leer - Introspection Collection (1989) - 2×CD reissue
 Lemmy - Damage Case (2006) – 2×CD compilation
 John Legend – Legend (2022)
 John Lennon - Some Time in New York City (1972) – studio/live
 Lift to Experience - The Texas-Jerusalem Crossroads (2001)
 Lil Dicky - Professional Rapper (2015) - 2xCD - studio
 Lil Flip - U Gotta Feel Me (2003)
 Lil Wayne - Tha Carter V (2018) - 2xCD - studio
 Rick van der Linden - Rainbow (1998)
 Udo Lindenberg - Intensivstationen (1993) – 2×CD live
 Little Tragedies - New Faust (2003)
 Little Tragedies - Chinese Songs (2007)
 Little Walter - Boss Blues Harmonica (1984) – 2×CD compilation
 Little Walter - The Essential Little Walter (1993) – 2×CD compilation
 Little Walter - Blues With A Feelin (1997) – 2×CD compilation
 The Liverpool Scene - Amazing Adventures Of / Bread On The Night (2002) – 2×CD reissue
 Livin' Blues - 3 Originals + Album (1998) – 2×CD reissue
 Livin' Blues - Bamboozle / Rocking at the Tweed Mill (2013) – 2×CD reissue
 Nils Lofgren - Night After Night (1977) – 2×LP – live
 Nils Lofgren - Steal Your Heart (1996) – 2×CD – live
 Jack Logan - Bulk (1994) - 2×CD
 Loggins and Messina - On Stage (1974)
 Loggins and Messina - Finale (1977)
 Los Lobos - Just Another Band From East L.A. (1993) – 2×CD
 Loop - Fade Out (2008) – 2×CD reissue
 Loop - A Gilded Eternity (2009)
 Lothar and the Hand People - Space Hymn (2003) – 2×CD compilation reissue
 Loudness - Sunburst (2021) – 2×CD
 Jacques Loussier - Play Bach (1965) – 2×LP
 Jacques Loussier - Play Bach aux Champs-Élysées (1965) – 2×LP
 Jacques Loussier - Play Bach 2000 (1995) – 2×CD
 Jacques Loussier - Jacques Loussier play Bach (1996) – 2×CD
 Jacques Loussier - Toccata: Jacques Loussier play Bach (2000) – 2×CD
 Jacques Loussier - Plays Bach: Encore! (2007) – 2×CD
 Jacques Loussier - Plays Johann Sebastian Bach (2010) – 2×CD
 Love - Out Here (1969)
 Arjen Lucassen - Lost in the New Real (2012)
 LTJ Bukem - Journey Inwards (2000) - 2×CD, 4×LP
 Lynyrd Skynyrd - One More from the Road (1976) - 2×LP
 Lynyrd Skynyrd - Gold & Platinum (1979) - 2×LP
 Lynyrd Skynyrd - Lynyrd Skynyrd Lyve: The Vicious Cycle Tour (2004) - 2×CD

M
 M83 - Hurry Up, We're Dreaming (2011) - 2×CD
 Martine McCutcheon -
The Collection  (2012) - 2×CD
 MC5 - Back in the USA / Kick Out The Jams (2008) – 2×CD reissue
 Paul McCartney - Tripping the Live Fantastic (1990) - 3×LP, 2×CS, 2×CD
 Paul McCartney - Liverpool Oratorio (1991) - 2×CD
 Paul McCartney - Back in the US (2002) - 2×CD
 Brownie McGhee - The Complete Brownie McGhee (1994) – 2×CD – compilation
 Roger McGuinn, Gene Clark & Chris Hillman - The Capitol Collection (2008) – 2×CD
 Nellie McKay - Get Away from Me (2004) - 2×CD
 Nellie McKay - Pretty Little Head (2006) - 2×CD
 Rod McKuen & Liesbeth List – Two Against The Morning (1972) – 2×LP
 Malcolm McLaren - Paris (1994) - 2×CD
 John McLaughlin - Remember Shakti (1999)
 John McLaughlin - Five Peace Band Live (2009)
 John McLaughlin - The Essential John McLaughlin (2009) – compilation
 John McLaughlin feat. Lifetime - In Retrospect (1974) – 2×LP – compilation
 John McLaughlin, Paco de Lucía & Al Di Meola - Friday Night in San Francisco  (1981) - 2×LP
 Grant McLennan - Horsebreaker Star (1994) - 2×CD
 Tony McPhee & The Groundhogs - High On The Hog (2004) – 2×CD 
 Machiavel - Live (1999)
 Machiavel - Anthology (2001)
 Machiavel - Live in Brussels (2007)
 Madness - Divine Madness (1992)
 Madura - Madura (1971)
 Frederik Magle - Like a Flame (2010)
 Mahavishnu Orchestra - Live at Montreux 1974 & 1984 (2007) – 2×DVD
 Magma - Kobaïa (1970) - 2×LP (debut album)
 Magna Carta - Spotlight On Magna Carta (1977) – 2×LP
 Magna Carta - Milestones (1994)
 Magna Carta - Where To Now? (2000)
 Magna Carta - In Tomorrow [+ bonus DVD] (2006)
 Magna Carta - Written in the Wind (2008)
 Magna Carta - Tomorrow never comes: the anthology 1969 – 2006 (2010)
 Magna Carta - Deserted Highways of the Heart... (2014)
 The Magnetic Fields - 69 Love Songs (1999) - 3×CD
 Mägo de Oz - Finisterra (2000) - 2×CD
 Mägo de Oz - Fölktergeist (2002) - 2×CD
 Mägo de Oz - Madrid – Las Ventas (2005) - 2×CD
 Mägo de Oz - Gaia II: La Voz Dormida (2005) - 2×CD
 Yngwie Malmsteen - Eclipse Double Pack (1991) – 2×CD reissue
 Yngwie Malmsteen - Yngwie Malmsteen: Live (1998)
 Man - Green Fly (1986) – 2×LP compilation
 Man - The Dawn of Man (1997) – 2×CD compilation
 Man - 3 Decades of Man: the 70s & 80s &90s  (2000) 
 Man - Many are called but few get up (2001) – compilation 
 Man - London 1972 (2002) – live
 Man - And in the beginning...complete early Man 1968–1969 (2004) 
 Man - Live At The Keystone, Berkeley, 9th August 1976 (2005) 
 Man - The History of Man (2005)
 Man - Keep On Crinting 1971–1975 (2008) 
 Man - Live at The Marquee + bonus DVD (2012)
 Man - The Welsh Connection (2013)
 Manassas - Manassas (1972) - 2×LP (debut album)
 Mandrill – Fencewalk: The Anthology (1997)
 Mango Groove – Faces to the Sun (2016)
 Manfred Mann - Mann Made / The Five Faces (1983) – 2×LP reissue
 Manfred Mann - Mighty Garvey! / As Is (1987) – 2×LP reissue
 Manfred Mann - The Ascent Of Mann: 1966–1969 (1997) – 2×CD – compilation
 Manfred Mann's Earth Band - The Evolution of Manfred Mann (1998) – 2×CD – compilation
 Manfred Mann's Earth Band - Mann Alive (2003)
 Michael Mantler, Jack Bruce, Don Cherry, Carla Bley, Robert Wyatt, Kevin Coyne & Chris Spedding - No Answer / Silence (2003) – 2×CD
 Mark-Almond - The Last & Live (1981) – 2×LP
 Marillion - The Best of Both Worlds (1997) - 2×CD
 Marillion - Marbles (2004) - 2×CD
 Bob Marley - Babylon By Bus (1978) - 2×LP
 John Martyn - John Martyn: Live (1995) 
 John Martyn - One World: deluxe edition (2004)
 John Martyn - Anthology (2004) 
 John Martyn - Grace and Danger: deluxe edition (2007) 
 John Martyn - Remembering John Martyn (1948–2009) (2009)
 John Martyn - Johnny Boy would love this...a tribute to John Martyn [+ bonus dvd] (2011) 
 John Martyn - Solid Air (deluxe edition) (2013)
 John Martyn - Piece by Piece (remastered) (2015) 
 John Martyn - Sapphire (2015)
 John Martyn - Live at Leeds (deluxe edition) (2015) 
 Dave Mason - Certified Live (1976) - 2×LP
 Massada - Live (1981) - 2×LP
 Massada - De jonge jaren van Massada (2008) 
 Matching Mole - Little Red Record (2012) - 2×CD reissue
 Matching Mole - Matching Mole (2013) - 2×CD reissue
 The Maxters - T-Bass (2009) - 2×LP, 2×CD
 John Mayall - Room to Move: 1969–1974 (1993)
 John Mayall - London Blues: 1964–1969 (1993)
 John Mayall - Rock The Blues Tonight (1999)
 John Mayall - The Turning Point: Music From The Original Film Soundtrack (1999)
 John Mayall - New year, New band, New company / Lots Of People (2000) – 2×CD reissue
 John Mayall - A Hard Core Package / The Last Of The British Blues (2000) – 2×CD reissue
 John Mayall - Notice To Appear / A Banquet In Blues (2000) – 2×CD reissue
 John Mayall - Rockin' the Roadshow (2003) – live
 John Mayall - 70th Birthday Concert (2003) – live
 John Mayall - Back To The Roots (2013)
 John Mayall & the Bluesbreakers - Live 1969 (2004)
 John Mayall & the Bluesbreakers - The Diary Of A Band (2007) – compilation
 John Mayall & the Bluesbreakers - In The Shadow Of Legends (2011) – live
 John Mayall & Eric Clapton & The Bluesbreakers - Blues Breakers John Mayall and Eric Clapton (2009) – 2×CD reissue
 Meat Beat Manifesto - Subliminal Sandwich (1996) – 2×CD
 Mecano - Ana Jose Nacho (1998)
 Megadeth - Rude Awakening (2002) - 2×CD
 Megadeth - That One Night: Live in Buenos Aires (2007)
 Megadeth - Anthology: Set the World Afire (2008)
 Melanie - Photograph (2005) - 2×CD
 Natalie Merchant - Leave Your Sleep - (2010) - 2×CD
 Metallica - ...And Justice For All (1988) - 2×LP
 Metallica - Live Shit: Binge and Purge (1993) - 3×CD
 Metallica - Garage Inc. (1998) - 2×CD
 Metallica - S&M (1999) - 2×CD
 Metallica and Lou Reed - Lulu (2011) - 2×CD
 Metallica - Hardwired...To Self-Destruct (2016) - 2×CD
 Pat Metheny - 80/81 (1980)
 Pat Metheny - Travels: Recorded live in concert (1982)
 Pat Metheny - Trio → Live (2000)
 Pat Metheny - Secret Story (2007)
 Pat Metheny - The Orchestrion Project (2013)
 Pat Metheny & Charlie Haden - Live in Germany (2003)
 Method Actors - Little Figures (1981) - 2×LP
MGMT – Congratulations (2010) – 2×LP
MGMT – Little Dark Age (2018) – 2×LP
Migos - Culture II (2018) - 2xCD - studio
Miley Cyrus/Hannah Montana - Hannah Montana 2: Meet Miley Cyrus (2007) - 2×CD
 Steve Miller Band - Anthology (1972) – 2×LP
 Steve Miller Band - King Biscuit Flower Hour Presents (2004) – 2×CD live
 Steve Miller Band - The Sessions (2009) – 2×CD live 
 Buddy Miles - Sneak Attack (1981) - 2×LP 
 Milton Nascimento & Lo Borges – Clube Da Esquina (1972)
 Kylie Minogue - Intimate and Live (1998) - 2×CD
 Kylie Minogue - Ultimate Kylie (2004) - 2×CD
 Kylie Minogue - Showgirl Homecoming Live (2007) - 2×CD
 Minutemen - Double Nickels on the Dime (1984) - 2×LP
 Minutemen - Ballot Result (1987) - 2×LP
 Joni Mitchell - Miles Of Aisles (1974) - 2×LP
 Joni Mitchell - Don Juan's Reckless Daughter (1977)
 Joni Mitchell - Shadows and Light (1980)
 The MO - Mo / Ha ha! The Sound of Laughing (2013) – 2×CD reissue
 Moby - Rare: The Collected B-Sides 1989-1993 (1996) - 2×CD
 Moby Grape - Vintage / The Very Best Of (1993) - 2×CD reissue
 Modern Talking - Alone (1999) - 2×CD
Modest Mouse - The Lonesome Crowded West (1997) - 2xLP
Modest Mouse - The Moon and Antarctica (2000) - 2xLP
 Mötley Crüe - Live: Entertainment or Death (1999)
 Mötley Crüe - Red, White & Crüe (2005) - 2×CD
 Mötley Crüe - Carnival of Sins Live (2006)
 Moloko - All Back to the Mine (2001) - 2×CD
 Thelonious Monk & John Coltrane - Monk / Trane (1973) – 2×LP – compilation
 The Moody Blues - This Is The Moody Blues (1974) - 2×LP
 The Moody Blues - Caught Live + 5 (1977) - 2×LP
 Keith Moon - Two Sides of the Moon (2006) - 2×CD deluxe edition
 Lee Morgan - Live at the Lighthouse (1971) – 2×LP
 Ennio Morricone - Il Était Une Fois...La Révolution / 22 Musiques Des Films De... (1976) – 2×LP reissue
 Ennio Morricone - Zijn Grootste Successen (1979) – 2×LP – compilation
 Ennio Morricone - The Greatest Filmmelodies Of... (1980) – 2×LP – compilation
 Ennio Morricone - Bandes et Musiques Originales (1984) – 2×LP
 Ennio Morricone - An Ennio Morricone Anthology (1996) – 2×CD
 Ennio Morricone - Film Music 1966–1987 (1997) – 2×CD – anthology
 Ennio Morricone - A Fistful of Sounds (1999) – 2×CD – anthology
 Ennio Morricone - Crime and Dissonance (2005) – 2×CD – anthology
 Ennio Morricone - The Man and his Music (2009) – 2×CD – anthology
 Ennio Morricone - Ennio Morricone Lounge Classics (2009) – 2×CD
 Ennio Morricone - La Piovra (2010) – 2×CD
 Ennio Morricone - Morricone Aromatico (2010) – 2×CD
 Ennio Morricone - Ennio Morricone: Deluxe Edition (2011) – 2×CD
 Ennio Morricone - Arena Concerto: Recorded live in Verona, Naples and Rome (2011) – 2×CD
 Ennio Morricone - Days of Heaven: Music from the motion picture (2013) – 2×CD
 Van Morrison - It's Too Late to Stop Now (1974)
 Van Morrison - Hymns to the Silence (1991)
 Neal Morse - Testimony (2003) - 2×CD
Neal Morse – Testimony 2 (2011) – 2xCD
The Neal Morse Band - The Similitude of a Dream (2016) - 2×CD
 Mother's Finest - Right Here, Right Now: Live at Villa Berg (2006)
 Mother's Finest - Live at Rockpalast 1978 + 2003 (2012)
 Motörhead - No Remorse (1985) - 2×LP - compilation
 Motörhead - The Best Of (2000) - 2×CD - compilation 
 Motörhead - Tear Ya Down: the Rarities (2002) – live 
 Motörhead - Live at Brixton Academy (2003)
 Motörhead - BBC Live & In-Session (2005) - 2×CD - reissue
 Motörhead - Bomber + extra tracks (2005) 
 Motörhead - The Essential Motörhead (2007)
 Motörhead - Better Motörhead than Dead: Live at Hammersmith (2007)
 Motörhead - Overkill: Deluxe edition + bonus tracks (2008)
 Motörhead - Iron Fist: Deluxe edition + extra tracks (2008)
 Motörhead - Ace of Spades: Deluxe edition + bonus tracks (2008)
 Motörhead - Bomber: Deluxe edition + bonus tracks (2008)
 Motörhead - No Sleep 'til Hammersmith: Deluxe edition (2009)
 Motörhead - The Wörld is Ours: Everywhere further than anyplace else [+ bonus dvd], vol.1 (2011)
 Motörhead - Another Perfect Day: Expanded edition (2015)
 Motörhead - Orgasmatron [+ bonus cd] (2015)
 Motörhead - Rock 'n Roll (2015)
 Motörhead - No Remorse [+ bonus tracks] (2015) 
 Motorpsycho - Timothy's Monster (1994) - 3×LP, 2×CD
 Motorpsycho - Trust Us (1998) - 2×CD
 Motorpsycho - Black Hole/Blank Canvas (2006) - 2×CD
 Mountain - Over the Top (1995)
 Mountain - New Year Concert 1971 (2012)
 Mount Eerie - Wind's Poem (2009) – 2×LP
 The Move - Shazam / Looking On The Move (?) – 2×LP reissue
 The Move - The Platinum Collection of The Move (1981) – 2×LP
 The Move - The Collection (1986) – 2×LP
 The Move - Hits & Rarities, singles A's & B's (2005) – 2×CD
 The Move - Move (2007) – 2×CD
 Mr. Albert Show -  Mr.Albert Show / Warm Motor (2014) – 2×CD reissue
Mr. Oizo – Lambs Anger (2008) – 2×LP
 Muse - Hullabaloo Soundtrack (2002) - 2×CD
My Bloody Valentine - Loveless (1991) – 2012 2xCD reissue

N
 Nas - Street's Disciple (2004) - 2×LP
 Nate Dogg - G-Funk Classics, Vol. 1 & 2 (1998)
 Nektar - Highlights (2001)
 Nektar - Sunday Night at London Roundhouse (2010) – 2×CD re-release
 Nektar - Retrospective 1969–1980 (2011)
 Nektar - Magic Is a Child (2014) – 2×CD deluxe edition
 Nektar - Live at the Patriots Theatre (2014)
 Willie Nelson - Willie and Family Live (1978) - 2×LP
 Willie Nelson - Greatest Hits (& Some That Will Be) (1981) - 2×LP
 Willie Nelson - The IRS Tapes: Who'll Buy My Memories? (1992) - 2×CD
 Nena - Willst du mit mir gehn (2005) – 2×CD
 Neu! - 2 Originals Of Neu! (1977) – 2×LP compilation reissue
 Neu! - Rock On Brain (1980) – 2×LP compilation
 The New Barbarians - Buried Alive: Live in Maryland (2006) – 2×CD live
 New Order - Substance (1987) - 2×LP, 2×CS, 2×CD
 New Order - Singles (2005) - 2×CD
 Nick Cave and the Bad Seeds - Abattoir Blues/The Lyre of Orpheus (2004) - 2×CD
 The Nice - The Immediate Years (1975) – 2×LP – compilation
 The Nice - The Nice Collection (1985) – 2×LP
 The Nice - The Long Versions (1999)
 The Nice - Hang On To A Dream (2004) – compilation
 The Nice - Everything as Nice as mother makes it: the best of (2006) – compilation
 The Nice - The Essential Collection (2006)
 The Nice - Live at the Fillmore East December 1969 (2009)
 The Nice - Diamond Hard Blue Apples Of The Moon (2010) – compilation 
 Nico - Behind The Iron Curtain (1986) – 2×LP
 Nico - The Frozen Borderline 1968–1970 (2007) – 2×CD reissue
 Nightwish - Human. :II: Nature. (2020) – 2xCD
 Nine Inch Nails - The Fragile (1999) - 3×LP, 2×CS, 2×CD
 Nine Inch Nails - And All That Could Have Been (2002) - 2×CD
 Nine Inch Nails - Year Zero (2007) - 3×LP
 Nine Inch Nails - Ghosts I-IV (2008) - 4×LP, 2×CD
 Nits - Urk – Live 1988–1989 (1989) - 3×LP, 2×CD
 Nits - Hits (2000) - plus bonus cd
 Nits - The Nits 1974 (2003) - plus bonus DVD
 Nits - Urk (2006) - plus bonus DVD
 NOFX - 45 or 46 Songs That Weren't Good Enough to Go on Our Other Records (2002) - 2×CD
 Noordkaap - 90/00 Avanti! [+ bonus cd] (2012) – compilation
 The Notorious B.I.G. - Life After Death (1997) - 2×CD
 NRBQ - Transmissions (2004) – 2×CD
 Nucleus - Elastic Rock / We'll Talk About It Later (1994) – 2×CD reissue
 Nucleus - Live in Bremen (2004) – 2×CD
 Nucleus - UK Tour '76 (2007) – 2×CD – live
 Nucleus - Under The Sun / Snakehips Etcetera (2007) – 2×CD reissue
 Nucleus - Labyrinth / Roots (2007) – 2×CD reissue
 Ted Nugent - Double Live Gonzo! (1978)
 Gary Numan - Living Ornaments '81 (1998) - 2×CD
 Laura Nyro - Stoned Soul Picnic: The Best Of Laura Nyro (1997)
 Laura Nyro - The Loom's Desire: Live (2002)

O
 Paul Oakenfold - Creamfields (2004) - 2×CD
 Oasis - Familiar to Millions (2000)
 Mike Oldfield - Incantations (1978) - 2×LP
 Mike Oldfield - Exposed (1979) - 2×LP – live
 Mike Oldfield - Airborn (1980) - 2×LP
 Mike Oldfield - Collection (2002)
 Mike Oldfield - Tr3s Lunas (2002)
 Mike Oldfield - Light + Shade (2005)
 Mike Oldfield - Tubular Bells II / Tubular Bells III (2008) – 2×CD release
 Mike Oldfield - Tubular Bells: Deluxe edition + bonus dvd (2009)
 Mike Oldfield - Hergest Ridge: Deluxe edition + bonus dvd (2010)
 Mike Oldfield - Ommadawn: Deluxe edition + bonus dvd (2010)
 Mike Oldfield - Incantations + bonus dvd (2011)
 Mike Oldfield - Platinum: Deluxe edition + bonus dvd (2012)
 Mike Oldfield - Two Sides: the very best of Mike Oldfield (2012)
 Mike Oldfield - QE2: Deluxe edition (2012)
 Mike Oldfield - Five Miles Out: Deluxe edition + bonus dvd (2013)
 Mike Oldfield - Crises: Deluxe edition – 30th anniversary [remastered] (2013)
 Mike Oldfield - Man on the Rocks (+ bonus cd) (2014)
 The Olivia Tremor Control - Music from the Unrealized Film Script, Dusk at Cubist Castle (1996)
 Oneida - Each One Teach One (2002)
 Yoko Ono - Fly (1971) - 2×LP
 Yoko Ono - Approximately Infinite Universe (1973) - 2×LP
 Orange Bicycle - Hyacinth Threads: The Morgan Blue Town Recordings (2001) – 2×CD compilation
 The Orb - The Orb's Adventures Beyond the Ultraworld (1991) - 2×CD (debut album)
 The Orb & David Gilmour - Metallic Spheres (2010) + bonus DVD reissue
 Oregon - In Performance (1980) – 2×LP
 Oregon & The Moscow Tchaikovsky Symphony Orchestra - In Moscow (2000)
 Jim O'Rourke - Disengage (1992) - 2×CD
 Osibisa - The Best Of (1990) - 2×CD
 Osibisa - Sunshine Day (1999) - 2×CD
 Osibisa - Black Magic Night : Live at the Royal Festival Hall (2005) - 2×CD
 Ozzy Osbourne - Speak of the Devil (1982) - 2×LP
 Ozzy Osbourne - Tribute (1987) - 2×LP
 Ozzy Osbourne - The Essential Ozzy Osbourne (2003) - 2×CD
 OutKast - Speakerboxxx/The Love Below (2003) - 4×LP, 2×CD
 Out Of Focus - Four Letter Monday Afternoon (1972; 1992; 2009; 2010) – 2×LP, 2×CD

P
 Pacific Gas & Electric - Are You Ready / Pacific Gas & Electric (2012) – 2×CD compilation reissue 
 Painkiller - Execution Ground (1994) - 2×CD
 Carl Palmer - Do Ya Wanna Play, Carl? (2014) – 2×CD anthology
 Pandora's Box - Original Sin (1989) - 2×LP (debut album)
 Graham Parker - Vertigo (2002) – studio + live compilation
 Graham Parker & The Rumour - Live at Rockpalast 1978 + 1980 (2012) – reissue 
 Parliament - Parliament Live: P-Funk Earth Tour (1977) - 2×LP
 Partner - A Man-Size Job Needs A Man-Size Meal / On Second Thoughts (2012) – 2xCD reissue
 Passport - Spirit of Continuity: The Passport Anthology (1995) – 2×CD
 Pavement - Wowee Zowee (1995) - sesquialbum
 Tom Paxton - The Compleat Tom Paxton (2014) - remastered reissue – live
 Pearl Jam - Lost Dogs (2003) - 2×CD
 Pearls Before Swine - The Wizard Of Is (2007) – 2×CD collection
 Periphery – Juggernaut: Alpha & Juggernaut: Omega (2015)
 Pentangle - Sweet Child (1968) - 2×LP
 Peter, Paul & Mary - In Concert (2) (1989) – 2×CD reissue
 Pet Shop Boys - Alternative (1995) - 2×CD
 Pet Shop Boys - Pop Art: Pet Shop Boys – The Hits (2003) - 2×CD
 Pet Shop Boys - Concrete (2006) - 2×CD
 Tom Petty - Pack Up the Plantation: Live! (1986) - 2×LP
 Shawn Phillips - Perspective (2013) – 2×CD
 Phish - Junta (1989) - 2×CD
 Phish - A Live One (1995) - 2×CD
 Pigface - A New High in Low (1997) - 2×CD
 Pimp C - Pimpalation (2006) - 2×CD (limited edition)
 Richard Pinhas & Merzbow - Keio Line (2009) 
Ariel Pink – Pom Pom (2014) – 2×LP
Pink Floyd - Ummagumma (1969) - 2×LP - studio/live
 Pink Floyd - A Nice Pair (1974) - 2×LP - reissue
 Pink Floyd - The Wall (1979) - 2×LP - studio
 Pink Floyd - Delicate Sound of Thunder (1988) - 2xLP, 2xcassette, 2×CD - live
 Pink Floyd - Pulse (1995) - 4xLP, 2xcassette, 2×CD - live
 Pink Floyd - Is There Anybody Out There? The Wall Live 1980-81 (2000) - 2×CD - live
 Pink Floyd - Echoes: The Best of Pink Floyd (2001) - 2×CD - compilation
 Pink Floyd - The Endless River (2014) - 2xLP
 Pink Floyd - Cre/ation: The Early Years 1967–1972 (2016) - 2×CD - compilation
 Poco - The Very Best of Poco (1975) – 2×LP
 Poco - The Forgotten Trail – 1969–74 (1990) – 2×CD
 Poco - Pickin' Up The Pieces / Poco (2005) – 2×CD compilation reissue
 The Police - The Police (Deluxe Edition) (2007) – 2×CD
 Polvo - Exploded Drawing (1996) - 2×LP
 Popol Vuh - Revisited & Remixed 1970–1999 (2011) - 2×CD reissue 
 Porcupine Tree - Stars Die: The Delerium Years 1991-1997 (2002) - 2×CD
 Porcupine Tree - The Incident (2009) - 2×CD - studio
 Prefab Sprout - Steve McQueen (2007) – 2×CD re-release
 Premiata Forneria Marconi - Stati di immaginazione (2006)
 Premiata Forneria Marconi - 35... e un minuto (2010)
 Prince - 1999 (1982) - 2×LP
 Prince - Sign o' the Times (1987) - 2×LP, 2×CD
 Prince - Graffiti Bridge (1990) - 2×LP
 Prince - Emancipation (1996) - 3×CD
 Prince - Crystal Ball (1997) - 3×CD
 Prince - LOtUSFLOW3R (2009) - 3×CD
 Prins Thomas - Principe del Norte (2016)
 Proto Sun - How Are You Today Sir? (2020) – 2×LP
 Richard Pryor - Wanted: Live in Concert (1978) - 2×LP
 The Psychedelic Furs - Should God Forget: A Retrospective (1997) - 2×CD
 Public Image Ltd - Second Edition (1980) - 2×LP
 Puhdys - Live im Friedrichstadtpalast (1979) – 2×LP
 Puhdys - Live – 25 Jahre die totale Aktion (1994)
 Pure Reason Revolution - The Dark Third (2007)

Q
 Q65 - The complete collection 1966–1969 (1993)
 Q65 - Singles A's & B's (2002)
 Queen - Live Killers (1979)
 Queen - Live at Wembley '86 (1992)
 Queen - Queen on Fire – Live at the Bowl (2004)
 Queen - Queen Rock Montreal (2007)
 Quicksilver Messenger Service - Anthology (1973) – 2×LP
 Quicksilver Messenger Service - Lost Gold and Silver: Unreleased (2000) – live + bonus tracks
 Quintessence - Infinite Love : Live at Queen Elizabeth Hall 1971 (2011)

R
 Raccoo-oo-oon - Raccoo-oo-oon (2008) - 2×LP
 Radiohead – OK Computer (1997) – 2×LP
Radiohead - In Rainbows (2007) - 2×CD + 2×LP
Radiohead – A Moon Shaped Pool (2016) – 2×LP
Radio Massacre International - Frozen North (1995) - 2×CD
 Radio Massacre International - Borrowed Atoms (1998) - 2×CD
 Radio Massacre International - Solid States (2003) - 2×CD
 Radio Massacre International - Emissaries (2005) - 2×CD
 The Ram Jam Band - Foot Stompin' Soul (2006)
 The Ram Jam Band - It's Geno Time (2011) 
 Ramones - It's Alive (1979) - 2×LP
 Ramones - Ramones Mania (1988) - 2×LP
 Ramones - Hey Ho! Let's Go: The Anthology (1999) - 2×CD
 Rammstein - Live Aus Berlin (1999) - 2×CD
 Rare Earth - Rare Earth in Concert (1971) - 2×LP
 Rare Earth - The Best of Rare Earth (1995) 
 The Rascals - Freedom Suite (1969) - 2×LP
 The Rascals - Peaceful World (1971) - 2×LP
 The Rascals - Anthology: 1965–1972 (1992) – 2×CD
 The Ravens - The Greatest Group Of Them All (1978) – 2×LP compilation reissue
 Redbone - Redbone (1970) - 2×LP
 Red Hot Chili Peppers - Blood Sugar Sex Magik (1991) - 2×LP, 1×CD
 Red Hot Chili Peppers - One Hot Minute (1995) - 2×LP, 1×CD
 Red Hot Chili Peppers - Californication (1999) - 2×LP, 1×CD
 Red Hot Chili Peppers - By The Way (2002) - 2×LP, 1×CD
 Red Hot Chili Peppers - Red Hot Chili Peppers Live in Hyde Park (2004) - 2×CD
 Red Hot Chili Peppers - Stadium Arcadium (2006) - 2×CD
 Red Hot Chili Peppers - I'm with You (2011) - 2×LP, 1×CD
 Lou Reed - Metal Machine Music (1975) - 2×LP
 Lou Reed - Live: Take No Prisoners (1978)
 Lou Reed - The Raven (2003)
 Lou Reed - Animal Serenade (2004) 
 Refugee - Affairs in Babylon / Burning from the inside out (2007) – 2×CD remastered
 Terry Reid - Live in London (2012)
 Renaissance - Live at Carnegie Hall (1976)
 REO Speedwagon - Live: You Get What You Play For (1977) - 2×LP
 Buddy Rich - Both Sides (1976) – 2×LP remastered compilation 
 Buddy Rich - Three Classic Albums Plus (2012) – 2×CD
 Buddy Rich - Buddy Rich and his buddies (2013) – 2×CD remastered
 Rising Sons - Rising Sons featuring Taj Mahal and Ry Cooder (recorded 1966, released 1992)
 Riverside - Shrine of New Generation Slaves (2013) 
 Riverside - Love, Fear and the Time Machine (2015)
 Max Roach & Cecil Taylor - Historic Concerts (1984) – 2×CD – live
 Andy Roberts - Just for the record: the solo anthology 1969–1976 (2005) – 2×CD reissue 
 The Ro-D-Ys – The Complete Collection (2003) – 2xCD compilation reissue
 The Ro-D-Ys – Just Fancy / Earnest Vocation (2013) – 2xCD reissue
 Roger Waters - The Wall: Live in Berlin (1990) - 2×CD live
 The Rolling Stones - Hot Rocks 1964-1971 (1971) - 2×LP
 The Rolling Stones - Exile on Main St. (1972)
 The Rolling Stones - More Hot Rocks (Big Hits & Fazed Cookies) (1972)
 The Rolling Stones - Love You Live (1977)
 The Rolling Stones - Forty Licks (2002)
 The Rolling Stones - A Bigger Bang (2005) – 2xLP
 Rotary Connection - Black Gold: The Very Best Of Rotary Connection (2006) 
 Roxy Music ‘’Live’’ (2003)
 Todd Rundgren - Something/Anything? (1972) - 2×LP
 Todd Rundgren - Todd (1974)
 Todd Rundgren - Back to the Bars (1978) - 2×LP
 Rowwen Hèze - t Beste van 2 Werelden (1999) – studio + live compilation
 Rowwen Hèze - Dageraad (2003)
 Rowwen Hèze - Zilver (2010) 
 Rowwen Hèze - Manne van Staal (2011)
 Rush - All The World's a Stage (1976) - 2×LP
 Rush - Exit...Stage Left (1981) - 2×LP
 Rush - A Show of Hands (1989) - 2×LP
 Rush - Chronicles (1990) - 2×CD
 Rush - Vapor Trails (2002) - 2×LP 1×CD
 Rush - Gold (2003)
 Rush - Snakes & Arrows (2007) - 2×LP 1×CD
 Rush - Snakes & Arrows Live (2008)
 Rush - Retrospective 3 (2009)
 Rush - Clockwork Angels (2012) - 2×LP 1×CD

S
 Sailor - The Epic Singles Collection (2011) - 2×CD compilation reissue
 Sabrina Salerno - Erase/Rewind Official Remix (2008) - 2×CD
 Sallyangie - Children of the Sun (2011) - 2×CD reissue
 Sanctuary Rig - Khnosti (2008) - 2×CD (debut album)
 Santana - Lotus (1975) - 3×LP
 Santana - Moonflower (1977) - 2×LP
 Santana - Live At The Fillmore 1968 (1997) - 2×CD
 Carlos Santana - The Swing of Delight (1980) - 2×LP
 Carlos Santana & Buddy Miles - Welcome / Live! (1988) – 2×LP, 2×CD re-release
 Joe Satriani - Time Machine (1993) - 2×CD
 Joe Satriani - Live in San Francisco (2001) – 2×CD
 Joe Satriani - The Electric Joe Satriani: An Anthology – 2×CD compilation
 Joe Satriani - Live in Tokyo (2005) – 2×CD
 Joe Satriani - I Just Wanna Rock: Live in Paris (2010) – 2×CD
 Joe Satriani - Satchurated: Live in Montreal (2012) – 2×CD
 Savoy Brown - The Savoy Brown Collection (1995) - 2×CD compilation
 Savoy Brown - Hellbound Train: Live 1969–1972 (2003) - 2×CD reissue
 Savoy Brown - Train to Nowhere (2013) – 2×CD compilation
 Savoy Brown - Songs from the Road [+ bonus DVD] (2013) – 2×CD 
 Say Anything - In Defense of the Genre (2007) - 2×CD
 Boz Scaggs - My Time: a Boz Scaggs Anthology 1969–1997 (1997)
 Boz Scaggs - Greatest Hits: Live (2004)
 Boz Scaggs - The Essential Boz Scaggs (2014) 
 Scarface - My Homies (1998) 
 Michael Schenker - Temple of Rock: Live in Europe (2012) – 2×CD
 Michael Schenker Group - One Night at Budokan (1981) – 2×LP live
 Michael Schenker Group - Portfolio-The Definitive Collection (1987) – 2×LP
 Michael Schenker Group - Assault Attack / Rock Will Never Die (1996) – 2×CD reissue
 Klaus Schulze - Cyborg (1973) - 2×LP
 Klaus Schulze - X (1978) - 2×LP
 Klaus Schulze - Audentity (1983) – 2×LP
 Klaus Schulze - En=Trance (1988) - 2×LP 
 Klaus Schulze - The Dresden Performance (1990) – 2×CD
 Klaus Schulze - The Essential – 1972/93 (1994) – compilation
 Klaus Schulze - Totentag (1994)
 Klaus Schulze - Das Wagner Desaster: Live (1995)
 Klaus Schulze - In Blue (1995)
 Klaus Schulze - Klaus Schulze...Live... (1997)
 Klaus Schulze - Richard Wahnfried's Tonwelle (2012) + bonus CD
 Klaus Schulze - Shadowlands (2013) – limited ed.
 Klaus Schulze & Rainer Bloss - Dziekuje Poland '83 (1983) – live
 Klaus Schulze & Lisa Gerrard - Farscape (2008) 
 John Scofield - Out Louder (2007) – studio + live
 John Scofield - In Case The World Changes Its Mind (2012) – live
 John Scofield & Trio Beyond - Saudades (2006)
 Screeching Weasel - Thank You Very Little (1999)
 Seals and Crofts - Seals & Crofts I & II (1974) – 2×LP compilation reissue
 John Sebastian - The Four of Us / Tarzana Kid / Welcome Back / BBC in concert 1970 (2014) – 2×CD reissue + bonus DVD 
 Pete Seeger - Pete Seeger singalong: Sanders Theatre, Cambridge, Massachusetts 1980 (1992) – live
 Pete Seeger - A Link In The Chain (1996)
 Pete Seeger - We Shall Overcome (1996) – live
 Pete Seeger - In Prague 1964 (2001) – live
 Pete Seeger - Brothers and Sisters, Vol.1 (2006) 2×CD compilation
 Pete Seeger - Live in '65 (2010)
 Pete Seeger - The complete Bowdoin College concert 1960 (2012)
 Pete Seeger - Pete remembers Woody (2012)
 Bob Seger - Live Bullet (1976) - 2×LP
 Bob Seger - Nine Tonight (1981) - 2×LP
 The Sensational Alex Harvey Band - The Collection (1986) – 2×LP – compilation
 The Sensational Alex Harvey Band - Sahb Stories / Rock Drill (2007) – 2×CD reissue
 The Sensational Alex Harvey Band - The Impossible Dream / Tomorrow Belongs To Me (2007) – 2×CD reissue
 The Sensational Alex Harvey Band - Framed / Next ... (2008) – 2×CD reissue
 The Sensational Alex Harvey Band - Live at the BBC (2009) – 2×CD
 SETI - Pharos (1995) - 2×CD
 Ramses Shaffy - 5 Jaar Hits (1974) – 2×LP 
 Ramses Shaffy - Alleen Als Je Me Verleidt (1994) – 2×CD
 Ramses Shaffy - Het Mooiste van Ramses Shaffy (1997)
 Ramses Shaffy - 3 Originals + extra tracks (1998)
 Ramses Shaffy - Shaffy Chantant & Shaffy Chantate (2001)
 Ramses Shaffy - Laat Me (2009)
 Ramses Shaffy & Liesbeth List - Back to Back (2010)
 Tupac Shakur - All Eyez on Me (1996) - 2×CD
 Tupac Shakur - R U Still Down? (Remember Me) (1997) - 2×CD
 Tupac Shakur - Greatest Hits (1998) - 2×CD
 Tupac Shakur - Until the End of Time (2001) - 2×CD
 Tupac Shakur - Better Dayz (2002) - 2×CD
 Sha Na Na - The night is still young: the golden age of rock 'n' roll (2014) – 2×CD reissue
 Ravi Shankar - Golden Jubilee Concert London (1990) - 2×CD
 Ravi Shankar - Festival from India (1996) - 2×CD – live 
 Ravi Shankar - Sitar Concertos and other Works (1998)
 Ravi Shankar - Rare and Glorious (2005)
 Ravi Shankar - The Essential Ravi Shankar (2005) 
 Ravi Shankar - The Very Best Of (2010)
 Ravi Shankar & Ali Akbar Khan - In Concert 1972 (1996) - 2×CD
 William Shatner - Seeking Major Tom (2011) – 2×CD
 Shihad - Pacifier Live (2003) - 2×LP
 Shiina Ringo - Utaite Myouli (2002) - 2×CD
 Shocking Blue - Singles A's and B's (2005) – 2×CD – compilation
 Show of Hands - Country Life (2003) - 2×CD
 Show of Hands - As You Were (2005) - 2×CD
 Carly Simon - Anthology (2002) - 2×CD
 Simon & Garfunkel - The Concert in Central Park (1982) - 2×LP
 Nina Simone - Ne me quitte pas (1971; 1972) – 2×LP
 Nina Simone - A Portrait of Nina Simone (1974) – 2×LP
 Nina Simone - Live in Paris (1974) – 2×LP
 Nina Simone - Lady Midnight (1987) – 2×LP
 Nina Simone - Moon of Alabama (1992) – 2×CD
 Nina Simone - The Masters (1998) – 2×CD
 Nina Simone - Sugar in my Bowl: 1967–1972 (1998) – 2×CD
 Nina Simone - Misunderstood (2000) – 2×CD
 Nina Simone - Emergency Ward / It Is Finished / Black Gold (2002) – 2×CD reissue
 Nina Simone - The Tomato Collection (2002) – 2×CD
 Nina Simone - Nina Simone at Newport, at The Village Gate and elsewhere... (2003) – 2×CD
 Nina Simone - Gold (2004; 2005) – 2×CD reissues
 Nina Simone - Mood Indigo (2004) – 2×CD
 Nina Simone - The Nina Simone collection : A selection of tracks recorded for the Colpix label 1959–1964 (2004) – 2×CD
 Nina Simone - Nina Simone at Carnegie Hall (2005) – 2×CD
 Nina Simone - Tell it like it is : Rarities and unreleased recordings 1967–1973 (2008) – 2×CD
 Nina Simone - Essential Early Recordings (2010) – 2×CD
 Nina Simone - Love Me Or Leave Me (2011) – 2×CD
 Nina Simone - The Complete 1955–1959 (2011) – 2×CD
 Nina Simone - Fine and mellow : Her first recordings 1958–1960 (2012) – 2×CD
 Nina Simone - The ultimate Nina Simone (2012) – 2×CD
 Nina Simone - The complete 1960–1961 (2012) – 2×CD
 Nina Simone - The Nina Simone anthology (2013) – 2×CD
 Frank Sinatra - Sinatra at the Sands (1966) - 2×LP
 Sir Douglas Quintet - The Collection (1986) – 2×LP
 Sir Douglas Quintet - Sir Doug's Recording Trip (1989) – 2×LP compilation
 Sir Douglas Quintet - The Crazy Cajun Recordings (1999) – 2×CD
 Skin Alley - Bad Words and Evil People: The Transatlantic Anthology 1972–73 (2006) – 2×CD reissue
 Skinny Puppy - Brap: Back and Forth Series 3 & 4 (1996) - 2×CD
 Sky - Sky 2 (1980) – 2×LP
 Sky - Sky Five Live (1983) – 2×LP
 Sky - Squared (1998) – 2×CD
 Sky - Anthology (2004) – 2×CD
 Slayer - Decade of Aggression (1991) - 2×CD
 Memphis Slim - Old Times, New Times (1972) – 2×LP
 Memphis Slim - The Bluesman (1974) – 2×LP
 Memphis Slim - Boogie Woogie (1975?) – 2×LP
 Memphis Slim - Right Now (1975) – 2×LP
 Memphis Slim - Memphis Slim 1940–1960 (2011) – 2×CD compilation
 Memphis Slim & Alexis Korner - Two of the same kind: London sessions [+ bonus tracks] (2012) – 2×CD reissue
 Slipknot - 9.0: Live (2005) - 2×CD
 Sloan - Never Hear The End Of It (2006) - 2×LP
 Sly and the Family Stone - The Woodstock Experience / Stand (2009) – 2×CD live + studio reissue
 Sly and the Family Stone - Stand / There's A Riot Goin' On (2009) - 2×CD reissue
 Sly and the Family Stone - Spaced Cowboy: The Best of Sly and the Family Stone (2009)
 Sly and the Family Stone - The Essential Sly & the Family Stone (2012) 
 Small Faces - The Autumn Stone (1969) - 2×LP
 The Smashing Pumpkins - Mellon Collie and the Infinite Sadness (1995) - 3×LP, 2×CD
 The Smashing Pumpkins - Machina II/The Friends & Enemies of Modern Music (2000) - 2×LP + 3×EP
 The Smashing Pumpkins - Siamese Dream (2011) – version w/ bonus DVD
 The Smashing Pumpkins - Gish (2011) – version w/ bonus DVD
 The Smashing Pumpkins - Pisces Iscariot (2012) – version w/ bonus DVD
 Bob Smith - The Visit (1970) – 2×LP
 Patti Smith and Kevin Shields - The Coral Sea (2005/06)
 The Smiths - Louder Than Bombs (1987) - 2×LP
 The Smoke - High in a Room (2002) – compilation
 Snoop Dogg - Bible of Love (2018) - 2xCD - studio
 Soft Machine - Third (1970) - 2×LP
 Soft Machine - Six (1973) - 2×LP
 Soft Machine - The Peel Sessions (1991) – 2×CD reissue
 Soft Machine - Alive & Well: Recorded in Paris (2011) – 2×CD reissue
 Soilwork - The Living Infinite (2013) - 2×LP
 Solaris - Live in Los Angeles (1996)
 Solution - Solution Live (2011) – 2×CD
 Sonic Youth - Daydream Nation (1988) - 2×LP
 Sonic Youth - Washing Machine (1995) - 2×LP
 Sonic Youth - A Thousand Leaves (1998) - 2×LP
 Sonic Youth - SYR4: Goodbye 20th Century (1999) - 2×LP, 2×CD
 Sonic Youth - Sonic Nurse (2004) - 2×LP
 The Sorrows - Take a Heart (2000) – 2×CD reissue
 Soul Whirling Somewhere - Hope Was (1998) - 2×CD
 The Soundtrack of Our Lives - Communion (2009) - 2×CD
 Speed, Glue & Shinki - Speed, Glue & Shinki (1972) – 2×LP
 Spirit - Spirit (1973) – 2×LP
 Spirit - Spirit of '76 (1975) - 2×LP
 Spirit - Time Circle, 1968–1972 (1991) - 2×CD compilation
 Spock's Beard - Snow (2002) - 2×CD
 Spock's Beard - Gluttons for Punishment (2005) - 2×CD
 Bruce Springsteen - The River (1980) - 2×LP
 Bruce Springsteen - Greetings from Asbury Park (NJ); The Wild, the Innocent and the E Street Shuffle (1991) – 2×CD reissue
 Bruce Springsteen - Nebraska; Darkness on the Edge of Town (1992) – 2×CD reissue
 Bruce Springsteen - Before The Fame (2000) 
 Bruce Springsteen - Live in New York City (2001) 
 Bruce Springsteen - The Essential Bruce Springsteen (2003) – 2×CD compilation
 Bruce Springsteen - Hammersmith Odeon, London '75 (2006) 
 Bruce Springsteen - Live in Dublin 2006 (2007)
 Bruce Springsteen - The Promise (2010) 
 Bruce Springsteen - Live at the Main Point, 1975 (2011)
 Bruce Springsteen - Live at the Roxy (2015) 
 Steamhammer - This is ... Steamhammer (1974) - 2×LP compilation
 Steamhammer - Riding On The L&N – The Anthology (2012) – 2×CD compilation 
 Steely dan 1972-78 compilation
 Steppenwolf - Born To Be Wild / Retrospective (1992)
 Steppenwolf - Gold (2005)
 Steppenwolf - Slow Flux / Hour of the Wolf (2013) 
 Stereophonics - Live from Dakota (2006) - 2×CD
 Rod Stewart - The Best of Rod Stewart (1976) - 2×LP
 Rod Stewart - The Best of Rod Stewart - Vol. II (1977) - 2×LP
 Rod Stewart - Absolutely Live (1982) - 2×LP
 Rod Stewart - The Mercury Anthology (1992)
 Stephen Stills - 2 Originals of Stephen Stills (1973) – 2×LP
 Stephen Stills & Manassas - Manassas (1972) - 2×LP
 Alan Stivell - Succès (?) – 2×LP
 Alan Stivell - Grands Succès (1975) – 2×LP
 Alan Stivell - Symphonie Celtique (1979) – 2×LP
 Alan Stivell - 70/95 Zoom (1997) – 2×CD compilation
 Alan Stivell - Ar Pep Gwellañ (2012) – 2×CD compilation + bonus CD
 Roine Stolt - Wallstreet Voodoo (2005) – 2×CD
 Stone the Crows - Radio Sessions 1969–1972 (2009) – 2xCD re-release
 Stone the Crows - BBC Sessions 1969–1972 (2014) – 2xLP re-release
 Stone the Crows - Stone the Crows / Ode to John Law (2015) – 2xCD reissue
 Stone the Crows - Teenage Licks / Ontinuous Performance (2015) – 2xCD reissue
 The Stooges - The Stooges (2005) – 2×CD reissue
 The Stooges - Fun House (2005) – 2×CD reissue
 The Strawbs - Preserves Uncanned (1990) 
 The Strawbs - Halcyon Days (1997)
 The Strawbs - Live at the BBC, Vol.2: In Concert (2010)
 The Strawbs - 40th Anniversary Celebration; Vol.1 : Strawberry Fayre (2011)
 Stray - Dangerous Games (2001) – 2×CD
 Stray - On the Top of the World (2006) – 2×CD
 Stray - Move It (2007) – 2×CD
 Styx - Caught in the Act (1984)
 Styx - Come Sail Away – The Styx Anthology (2005) - 2×CD
 The Suburbs - Credit in Heaven (1981) - 2×CD
 Sufjan Stevens - Michigan (2003) - 2xLP - studio
 Sufjan Stevens - Illinois (2005) - 2xLP - studio
 Sufjan Stevens - The Age of Adz (2010) - 2xLP - studio
 Donna Summer - Once Upon a Time (1977) - 2×LP
 Donna Summer - Live and More (1978) - 2×LP
 Donna Summer - Bad Girls (1979) - 2×LP
 Donna Summer - On the Radio Vol. I & II (1980) - 2×LP
 Moses Sumney - Græ (2020) - 2×LP - studio
 Sunn O))) - Flight of the Behemoth (2002) - 2×LP
 Sunn O))) - Monoliths and Dimensions (2009) - 2×LP
 Sun Ra - Live from Soundscape (1994) - 2×CD
 Sun Ra - The Singles, 1954–1982 (1997) - 2×CD
 Sun Ra - Black Myth: Out in Space (1998) - 2×CD
 Sun Ra - The Great Lost Sun Ra Albums: Cymbals; Crystal Spears (2000) - 2×CD
 Sun Ra - Media Dreams: Sessions Milan 1979 (2009) - 2×CD
 Sun Ra - Live in Rome (2010) - 2×CD
 Supercharge - Jump! The very best of Albie Donnelly's Supercharge (remastered) (2015) – 2×CD compilation
 Supersister – Supersisterious (2001) – 2×CD live
 Supertramp - Paris (1980) - 2×LP live
 Supertramp - It was the best of times (1999) – 2xCD compilation
 Supertramp - Retrospectacle: the Anthology (2005) – 2xCD compilation reissue
 Supertramp - Breakfast in America (2010) – 2xCD rem. deluxe edition
 Supertramp - Crime of the Century / Crisis? What Crisis? (2011) – 2xCD reissue
 Supertramp - Crime of the Century (2014) – 2xCD deluxe edition
 Swans - Children of God (1987) - 2×LP - studio
 Swans - White Light from the Mouth of Infinity (1991) - 2xLP - studio
 Swans - The Great Annihilator (1995) - 2xLP - studio
 Swans - Soundtracks for the Blind (1996) - 2×CD - studio
 Swans - Swans Are Dead (1998) - 2×CD - live
 Swans - The Seer (2012) - 2×CD - studio
 Swans - To Be Kind (2014) - 2×CD - studio
 Swans - The Glowing Man (2016) - 2×CD - studio
 David Sylvian - Gone to Earth (1986) - 2×LP
 Symarip - Skinhead Moonstomp : Deluxe Edition (2008)
 Synæsthesia - Desideratum (1995) - 2×CD
 System of a Down - Mezmerize and Hypnotize

T
 Taj Mahal - Take a Giant Step / De Ole Folks at Home (1969) - 2×LP
 Taj Mahal - The Real Thing (1971) - 2xLP
 Taj Mahal - The Collection (1987) – 2xLP
 Taj Mahal - The Essential Taj Mahal (2005) – 2xLP
 Taj Mahal - The hidden treasures of Taj Mahal 1969–1973 ; Live at The Royal Albert Hall 1970 (2012) 
 Taj Mahal - Sing a Happy Song: The Warner Bros. Recordings (2014) – 2xCD
 Taj Mahal - Brothers ; Music fuh ya' ; Evolution (2015) – 2xCD reissue
 Taj Mahal & The Hula Blues Band - Live at Kauaï (2015)
 Talking Heads - The Name of This Band Is Talking Heads (1982) - 2×LP
 Talking Heads - Sand in the Vaseline: Popular Favorites (1992) – 2×CD
 Tame Impala – Currents (2015) – 2xLP
 Tangerine Dream - Zeit (1972) - 2×LP
 Tangerine Dream - Encore (1977) - 2×LP
 Tangerine Dream - Poland (1984) - 2×LP
 Tangerine Dream - Book of Dreams (1995) – 2×CD compilation
 Tangerine Dream - Rockface (2003) - 2×CD
 Tangerine Dream - Purgatorio (2004) - 2×CD
 Tangerine Dream - Arizona Live (2004) - 2×CD
 Tangerine Dream - Rocking Mars (2005) - 2×CD
 Tanzwut - Schattenreiter (2006) - 2×CD
 Taste - 2 Original LP's ( ? ) 
 Taste - The Best of Taste (1988) – 2×CD
 Cecil Taylor - In Transition (1975) – 2×LP
 Cecil Taylor - Student Studies (1981) - 2×LP
 Cecil Taylor - Garden (1982) – 2×LP
 Cecil Taylor - One Too Many Salty Swift and Not Goodbye (1991) - 2×CD 
 Cecil Taylor, Charles Tolliver, Grachan Moncur & Archie Shepp - The New Breed (1978) – 2×LP – compilation 
 TC Matic - Compil Complet ! (2000) – 2×CD – compilation
 Tech N9ne - Killer (2008) - 2×CD
 Television - The Blow Up – Roir Sessions (1990) – 2×CD
 Ten Years After - Recorded Live (1973) - 2×LP
 Ten Years After - Live at the Fillmore East 1970 (2001) - 2×CD
 Ten Years After - Roadworks: Live (2006) - 2×CD
 Sonny Terry - The Blues : Mountain Harmonica 1938–1953 (2005) – 2×CD
 Sonny Terry & Brownie McGhee - Midnight Special (1977) – 2×LP
 Sonny Terry & Brownie McGhee - The Essential Sonny Terry & Brownie McGhee (2009) – 2×CD
 Mikis Theodorakis - 30 Golden Hits (?) – 2×LP
 Mikis Theodorakis - To Axion Esti (1964) – 2×LP
 Mikis Theodorakis - Le Soleil et le Temps (1978) – 2×LP
 Mikis Theodorakis - 3rd Symphony (1982) – 2×LP
 Mikis Theodorakis - On The Screen (1994) – 2×CD
 Mikis Theodorakis - O Zorbas – A Man & his Music (2003) – 2×CD
 Mikis Theodorakis & Pablo Neruda - Canto General (1975) - 2×LP
 The The - 45 RPM (2002)
 They Might Be Giants - Then: The Earlier Years (1997) - 2×CD
 They Might Be Giants - Dial-A-Song: 20 Years Of They Might Be Giants (2002) - 2×CD
 They Might Be Giants - The Else (2007)
 Thin Lizzy - Live and Dangerous (1978) - 2×LP
 Third Ear Band - Hymn to the Sphinx (2001) 
 Big Mama Thornton - Stronger Than Dirt / The Way It Is (1988) – 2×LP compilation reissue 
 Big Mama Thornton - The Complete 1950–1961 (2013)
 Three Dog Night - Seven Separate Fools / Around the World with Three Dog Night (1972; 2006) – 2×LP; 2×CD re-release
 Three Dog Night - Three Dog Night (1977) – 2×LP compilation 
 Three Dog Night - Celebrate: The Three Dog Night Story, 1965–1975 (1993) – 2×CD compilation
 Throbbing Gristle - 20 Jazz Funk Greats (2012) – 2×CD, remastered w/ bonus cd 
 Throbbing Gristle - D.o.A : The third and final report of Throbbing Gristle (2012) – 2×CD w/ bonus CD 
 Throbbing Gristle - Greatest Hits (2012) – 2×CD reissue 
 Throwing Muses - In a Doghouse (1998) - 2×CD
 Justin Timberlake - The 20/20 Experience – 2 of 2 (2013) - 2xCD w/ bonus CD
 Today Is the Day - Sadness Will Prevail (2002) - 2×CD
 Tones on Tail - Everything! (1998) - 2×CD
 Toots & The Maytals - Live in London (1999) – 2×CD
 Toots & The Maytals - Pressure Drop; the Definitive Collection (2005) – 2×CD compilation
 Toots & The Maytals - The Essential Collection (2006) – 2×CD compilation
 Toots & The Maytals - Sweet and Dandy (2008) – 2×CD reissue
 Toots Thielemans - Yesterday & Today (2012) – 2×CD anthology
 Toots Thielemans - The Best of Toots Thielemans (2012) – 2×CD
 Tower of Power - Hipper Than Hip: Yesterday, Today & Tomorrow (2014) 
 Pete Townshend - Scoop (1983)
 Pete Townshend - Another Scoop (1986)
 Traffic - On the Road (1973) – 2×LP live
 Traffic - Smiling Phases (1992) – 2×CD compilation
 Traffic - Gold (2005) – 2×CD compilation
 Traffic - John Barleycorn Must Die [remastered] (2011) – 2×CD studio + live reissue
 The Tragically Hip - Yer Favourites (2005) – 2xCD compilation
 Brian Transeau - Ima (1995) - 2×CD
 Transatlantic - Live in America (2001)
 Transatlantic - Live in Europe (2003)
 Transatlantic - The Whirlwind (2009)
 The Troggs - Star Gold (?) – 2×LP compilation
 The Troggs - Archeology 1966–1976 (1993) – 2×CD compilation 
 Robin Trower - This Was Now '74–'98 (1999) – compilation
 Robin Trower - RTatRO.08 (2009) - live
 Robin Trower - At The BBC 1973–1975 (2011)
 Robin Trower - State to State : Live Across America 1974–1980 (2013)
 The Tubes - What Do You Want from Live (1978) - 2×LP
 The Tubes - Goin' Down the Tubes (1996) – 2×CD
 Tina Turner - Tina Live in Europe (1988) - 2×CD / 2×LP
 Tina Turner - All The Best (2004) - 2×CD
 The Turtles - Solid Zinc: the Anthology (2003)
 Trumans Water - Spasm Smash XXXOXOX Ox & Ass (1994) - 2×LP
 Shania Twain - Up! (2002) – 2×CD
 Judie Tzuke - Road Noise (1994) – 2×CD live
 Judie Tzuke - Moon on a mirrorball: The definitive collection (2010) – 2×CD compilation

U
 U2 - Rattle and Hum (1988) - 2×LP
 UGK- Underground Kingz (2007) - 2×CD
 Underworld - Second Toughest In The Infants (1996)
 Underworld - Underworld: 1992–2002 (2002) - 2×CD compilation
 Uneven Eleven - Live at Café Oto (2015) – 2×CD 
 Univers Zéro - Univers Zéro aka 1313 (1977; 2016) – 2×LP re-release
 Unknown Mortal Orchestra - V (2023) - 2×LP – studio
 Unwound - Leaves Turn Inside You (2001) - 2×CD
 Uriah Heep - Uriah Heep Live (1973) - 2×LP
UFO -  Strangers in the Night (1978) - 2×LP

V
 Van der Graaf Generator - Present (2005) - 2×CD
 Van der Graaf Generator - Real Time: Royal Festival Hall, London 06.05.05 (2007) - 2×CD 
 Vampire Weekend – Father of the Bride (album)
 Van der Graaf Generator - Recorded Live In Concert At Metropolis Studios, London (2012) - 2×CD
 Van Halen - Live: Right Here, Right Now (1993) - 2×CD
 Van Halen - The Best of Both Worlds (2004) - 2×CD
 Van Halen - Tokyo Dome Live in Concert (2015) - 2×CD
 Van Morrison - Hymns to the Silence (1991) – 2×CD
 Vanilla Fudge - 2 Originals of Vanilla Fudge (1976) – 2×LP reissue
 Various artists - Jesus Christ Superstar (1970)
 Various artists - Woodstock 2 (1971) - 2×LP, 2×CD
 Various artists - The Concert for Bangladesh (1971) - 3×LP, 2×CD
 Various artists - Nuggets: Original Artyfacts from the First Psychedelic Era, 1965-1968 (1972) - 2×LP
 Various artists - Mar y Sol (1972) - 2×LP
 Various artists - Greasy Truckers Party (1972) - 2×LP
 Various artists - American Graffiti (1973) - 2×LP
 Various artists - The 10th American Folk Blues Festival (1972) (1973) - 2×LP
 Various artists - Greasy Truckers Live at Dingwalls Dance Hall (1974) - 2×LP
 Various artists - Saturday Night Fever (1977) 2×LP
 Various artists - Grease (1978) - 2×LP
 Various artists - California Jam 2 (1978) – 2×LP live compilation
 Various artists - Hope & Anchor Front Row Festival (1978) – 2×LP live
 Various artists - Jeff Wayne's Musical Version of The War of the Worlds (1978)
 Various artists - International P.E.A.C.E. Benefit Compilation (1984) - 2×LP and (1997) 2×CD reissue
 Various artists - WAAHNSINN (1986) - 2×LP and (2008) 2×CD reissue – live
 Various artists - Trance Europe Express (1993) - 2×CD
 Various artists - Trance Europe Express 2 (1994) - 2×CD
 Various artists - Trance Europe Express 3 (1994) - 2×CD
 Various artists - 25 Jaar Pinkpop 1970–1994 (1994) - 2×CD
 Various artists - Golden Miles : Australian progressive rock 1969–'74 (1995) – 2×CD
 Various artists - Free to Fight (1995) - 2×LP
 Various artists - Trance Atlantic (1995) - 2×CD
 Various artists - Wasted: The Best of Volume, Part I (1995) - 2×CD
 Various artists - Sharks Patrol These Waters: The Best of Volume, Part II (1995) - 2×CD
 Various artists - Trance Europe Express 4 (1995) - 2×CD
 Various artists - Trance Atlantic 2 (1995) - 2×CD
 Various artists - Acid Flash; vol.1 (1995)
 Various artists - Acid Flash; vol.2–4 (1996) 
 Various artists - Message to Love: the Isle of Wight Festival 1970 (1996) - 2×CD
 Various artists - TEXtures (1996) - 2×CD
 Various artists - Trance Europe Express 5 (1996) - 2×CD
 Various artists - Zabriskie Point (1997) - 2×CD reissue w/ outtakes
 Various artists - Acid Flash; vol.6–7 (1997)
 Various artists - Volume Seventeen (1997) - 2×CD
 Various artists - 2001 – A Space Rock Odyssey (2001) – 2×CD
 Various artists - Fields And Streams (2002) - 2×CD
 Various artists - Cargo: a deluxe collection of world & ambient music (2003) 
 Various artists - Concert for George (2003)
 Various artists - Mysterious Voyages: A Tribute to Weather Report (2005)
 Various artists - Masters Of Horror Soundtrack (2005) - 2×CD
 Various artists - Krautrock: Music for your Brain (2006) – 6×CD compilation reissue
 Various artists - Anticomp Folkilation (2007) - 2×CD
 Various artists - Dear Mr Fantasy: A Celebration for Jim Capaldi (2007)
 Various artists - Cries from the Midnight Circus: Ladbroke Grove 1967–1978 (2007) – 2×CD compilation
 Various artists - Far, far from Ypres: Songs, poems and music of World War I (2008) 
 Various artists - Legends of Woodstock : Spirit of 1969 (2009)
 Various artists - 40 Jaar Pinkpop live NL (2009) - 2×CD
 Various artists - Wondrous Stories. 33 Artists that shaped the Prog Rock Era (2010)
 Various artists - The Sound of Jazz: The Best of Impulse (2011)
 Various artists - Alice in Wonderland & Other Rainy Girls: The Great Lost Southern Popsike Trip (2013) – 2×CD compilation reissue
 Various artists - Deutsche elektronische Musik; vol.1 (2010) – 2×LP, 2×CD compilation 
 Various artists - Deutsche elektronische Musik; vol.2: 1971 – 1983 (2013) – 2×CD compilation
 Various artisis - Sing Street: Original Motion Picture Soundtrack (2016) - 2×LP
 Herman van Veen - Liederbuch
 Herman van Veen - Het Verhaal van de Clowns
 Herman van Veen - In Vogelvlucht – 20 Jaar
 Herman van Veen - Het Een en Ander
 Herman van Veen - Overblijven
 Herman van Veen - Carré 3 Amsterdam
 Herman van Veen - Gezongen
 Herman van Veen - Carré Amsterdam
 Herman van Veen - Carré, Amsterdam (1991)
 Herman van Veen - The Collection (1993)
 Herman van Veen - Nu en Dan: 30 Jaar Herman van Veen (1998)
 Herman van Veen - Het Een en Ander (2008)
 Herman van Veen - Lieber Himmel (2013)
 Herman van Veen - Alle 40 Goed (2013) 
 Caetano Veloso - Antologia 67/03 (2003)
 Caetano Veloso & Maria Gadú - Multishow ao vivo (2011) – 2×CD live
 The Velvet Underground - 1969: The Velvet Underground Live (1974) - 2×LP
 The Velvet Underground - Live MCMXCIII (1993) - 2×CD
 The Velvet Underground & Nico - The Velvet Underground & Nico (2002) - 2×CD deluxe edition
 Vennaskond - Priima (1999) - 2×CD
 The Ventures - 10th Anniversary Album (1970) - 2×LP
 The Ventures - Only Hits (1973) - 2×LP
 Andreas Vollenweider - The Trilogy (1990) - 2×CD – compilation reissue
 Andreas Vollenweider - The essential Andreas Vollenweider (2000) – 2×CD – compilation
 Andreas Vollenweider & Friends - Live – 1982–1994 (1994)
 Andreas Vollenweider & Friends - 25 Years Live (1982–2007) (2009)
 Cornelis Vreeswijk - De Nozem en de Non (2000) - 2×CD reissue
 Cornelis Vreeswijk - Live 1981 (2000) - 2×CD
 Cornelis Vreeswijk - Een Hommage (2002) - 2×CD

W

 Morgan Wallen - Dangerous:The Double Album (2020)
 The Waifs - A Brief History... (2004) - 2×CD
 Rufus Wainwright - Rufus Does Judy at Carnegie Hall (2007) - 2×CD
 Tom Waits - Nighthawks at the Diner (1975) – 2×LP live
 Tom Waits - Rain Dogs / Swordfishtrombones (1992) – 2×CD compilation re-issue
 Rick Wakeman - Rhapsodies (1979) - 2×LP
 Rick Wakeman - An Evening of Yes Music Plus (1994) – 2×CD – live
 Rick Wakeman - Wakeman with Wakeman: the official bootleg (1994) – 2×CD – live
 Rick Wakeman - Greatest Hits (1995) – 2×CD – compilation
 Rick Wakeman - Voyage (1996) – 2×CD
 Rick Wakeman - The Masters (1999) – 2×CD
 Rick Wakeman - The Caped Collection (2000) – 2×CD – compilation
 Rick Wakeman - The Definitive Music of Rick Wakeman (2002) – 2×CD – compilation
 PT Walkley - Mr. Macy Walks Alone (2009) – 2×LP
 War - The Black-Man's Burdon (1971) - 2×LP
 Muddy Waters - Fathers and Sons (1969) – 2×LP
 Muddy Waters - McKinley Morganfield (1971) – 2×LP
 Muddy Waters - Rare Live Recordings Vol.2 (1972) – 2×LP
 Muddy Waters - One More Mile / The Original Hoochie Coochie Man (1973) – 2×LP reissue
 Muddy Waters - Experiment in Blues (1973) – 2×LP compilation
 Muddy Waters - Chicago Golden Years 5 (1976) – 2×LP compilation
 Muddy Waters - Chess Masters Vol.2 (1982) – 2LP compilation
 Muddy Waters - Chess Masters Vol.3 (1983) – 2×LP compilation
 Muddy Waters - Chicago Blues Band – Switzerland 1976 (1990) – 2×CD live
 Muddy Waters - Rolling Stone 1941–1950 (2001) – 2×CD compilation
 Muddy Waters - Screamin' and Cryin''' (2004) – 2×CD compilation
 Muddy Waters - Hoochie Coochie Man: The Complete Chess Masters Volume 2, 1952–1958 (2004) – 2CD remast. compilation, deluxe edition 
 Muddy Waters - The Essence Of Muddy Waters (Featuring 50 Of His Greatest Recordings) (2007) – 2×CD compilation
 Muddy Waters - Gold (2007) – 2×CD remastered compilation
 Muddy Waters - Singing The Blues 1954–1959 (2010) – 2×LP compilation
 Muddy Waters - The Voice & The Guitar Of McKinley Morganfield 1947–1954 (2010) – 2×LP compilation
 Muddy Waters - Hoochie Coochie Man (2011) – 2×LP compilation
 Muddy Waters & Howlin' Wolf - The Gold Collection (1997) – 2×CD compilation
 Roger Waters - The Wall Live in Berlin (1990)
 Roger Waters - In the Flesh Live (2000) - 2×CD
 Roger Waters - Ça Ira (2005) - 2×CD
 Weather Report - Live in Tokyo (1972; 1995) – 2×LP; 2×CD 
 Weather Report - 8:30 (1979; 1994) – 2×LP; 2×CD
 Weather Report - Live and Unreleased (2002) – 2×CD re-release 
 Weather Report - Live in Berlin 1975 [+ bonus dvd] (2011)
 Weather Report - Live in Offenbach 1978 (2011) 
 Weather Report - Live in Cologne 1983 (2011) 
 Ween - Paintin' the Town Brown: Ween Live 1990-1998 (1999) - 2×CD
 Scott Weiland - Happy In Galoshes (2008) - 2×CD
Kanye West - 808's and Heartbreak (2008) - 2xLP
 Leslie West & Mountain - The Man and the Mountain (2013)
 Tony Joe White - Greatest Hits And More (2000) – 2×CD – compilation
 The Whitlams - Little Cloud and the Apple's Eye (2006) - 2×CD
 The Who - Tommy (1969) - 2×LP
 The Who - Quadrophenia (1973) - 2×LP
 The Who - The Kids Are Alright (1979) - 2×LP
 The Who - Live at the Isle of Wight Festival 1970 (1996) - 2×CD
 The Who - Live at Hull (2012)
 Wigwam - Fairyport (1971) - 2×LP
 Wilco - Being There (1996) - 2×CD
 Hank Williams III - Straight to Hell (2006) - 2×CD
 John Williams - Star Wars (1977) - 2×LP
 Mary Lou Williams & Cecil Taylor - Embraced (1978) – 2×LP – live
 Brian Wilson - Live at the Roxy Theatre (2000) - 2×CD
 Steven Wilson - Grace for Drowning (2011) - 2×CD
 The Wind - Harum-Scarum (2010) - 2×CD
 Wings - Wings Over America (1976) - 3×LP, 2×CD
 Wings - Wingspan: Hits and History (2001) - 4×LP, 2×CD
 Edgar Winter - Roadwork (1972) - 2×LP
 Johnny Winter - Second Winter (1969) - sesquialbum
 Wire - Document and Eyewitness (1989) - 2×LP
 Wire - Live at The Roxy, London 1977 / Live at CBGB Theatre, New York 1978 (2014) 
 Wishbone Ash - Live Dates (1973) - 2×LP
 Wishbone Ash - Live Dates Volume Two (1980) - 2×LP (Early printings. Later on reverted to single LP)
 Howlin' Wolf & Muddy Waters - Howlin' Wolf & Muddy Waters (2001) – 2×CD compilation
 Stevie Wonder - Songs in the Key of Life (1976) - 2×LP + 7"
 Stevie Wonder - Journey through the Secret Life of Plants (1979) - 2×LP
 Stevie Wonder - Original Musiquarium - Vol. I (1982) - 2×LP
 Ronnie Wood - Live and Eclectic (2000) - 2×CD
 Marcel Worms - Red White & Blues: 32 New Dutch Blues (2007)
 Wu-Tang Clan - Wu-Tang Forever (1997) - 2×CD
 Steve Wynn - Here Come the Miracles (2001) - 2×CD - studio

X
 Xiu Xiu - Remixed & Covered (2007) - 2×CD
 XTC - English Settlement (1982) - 2×LP
 XTC - Oranges and Lemons (1989)2 LP, 1 Compact Disc
 XTC Nonsuch (1992) 2 LP, 1 Compact Disc

Y
 Rachael Yamagata - Elephants...Teeth Sinking Into Heart (2008) - 2×CD
 Stomu Yamashta, Steve Winwood, Michael Shrieve, Al Di Meola & Klaus Schulze - The Go Sessions (2005)
 Yes - Tales from Topographic Oceans (1973) - 2×LP
 Yes - Yessongs (1973) - 3×LP, 2×CD
 Yes - Yesshows (1980) - 2×LP
 Yes - Keys to Ascension (1996) - 2×CD
 Yes - Keys to Ascension 2 (1997) - 2×CD
 La Monte Young - The Well-Tuned Piano (1981) – 5×CD
 Neil Young - Journey Through the Past (1972) - 2×LP
 Neil Young - 2 Originals: Neil Young & Everybody Knows This Is Nowhere (1975) – 2×LP reissue
 Neil Young - Decade (1977) - 3×LP, 2×CD
 Neil Young - Storytone (2014) - 2×CD deluxe edition
 Neil Young and Crazy Horse - Live Rust (1979)
 Neil Young and Crazy Horse - Weld (1991) - 2×CD
 Neil Young and Crazy Horse - Year of the Horse (1997) - 2×CD
 Neil Young and Crazy Horse - Live in San Francisco (2009) – 2×CD
 Neil Young and Crazy Horse - Psychedelic Pill (2012) - 2×CD – studio

Z
 Frank Zappa - Zappa in New York (1978)
 Frank Zappa - Sheik Yerbouti (1979)
 Frank Zappa - Joe's Garage (1979) - 3×LP, 2×CD
 Frank Zappa - Tinsel Town Rebellion (1981) - 2×LP
 Frank Zappa - Shut Up 'n Play Yer Guitar (1981) - 3×LP
 Frank Zappa - You Are What You Is (1981) - 2×LP
 Frank Zappa - Thing-Fish (1984)
 Frank Zappa - Guitar (1988)
 Frank Zappa - You Can't Do That on Stage Anymore, Vol. 1 (1988)
 Frank Zappa - You Can't Do That on Stage Anymore, Vol. 2 (1988)
 Frank Zappa - You Can't Do That on Stage Anymore, Vol. 3 (1989)
 Frank Zappa - The Best Band You Never Heard in Your Life (1991)
 Frank Zappa - You Can't Do That on Stage Anymore, Vol. 4 (1991)
 Frank Zappa - Make a Jazz Noise Here (1991)
 Frank Zappa - You Can't Do That on Stage Anymore, Vol. 5 (1992)
 Frank Zappa - You Can't Do That on Stage Anymore, Vol. 6 (1992)
 Frank Zappa - Playground Psychotics (1992)
 Frank Zappa - Civilization, Phaze III (1994)
 Frank Zappa - Strictly Commercial (1995) - 2×LP
 Frank Zappa - The MOFO Project/Object (2006) - 2×CD
 Frank Zappa and The Mothers of Invention - Freak Out! (1966) - 2×LP (debut album)
 Frank Zappa and the Mothers of Invention - Uncle Meat (1969) - 2×LP
 Frank Zappa and the Mothers of Invention - Roxy and Elsewhere (1974) - 2×LP
 John Zorn - Pool (1980) - 2×LP
 John Zorn - Archery (1982) - 2×LP
 John Zorn - Locus Solus (1983) - 2×LP
 John Zorn - Bar Kokhba (1996) - 2×CD
 John Zorn - The Circle Maker (1998) - 2×CD
 John Zorn - Cartoon S/M (2000) - 2×CD
 John Zorn, Bill Laswell & Tatsuya Nakamura - Buck Jam Tonic (2003) - 2×CD
 John Zorn - Sanhedrin 1994-1997 (2005) - 2×CD
 Zwan - Mary Star of the Sea + bonus DVD'' (2003)

See also
 List of triple albums
 Lists of albums

References

Double albums, List of